= Lens antenna =

Microwave antenna

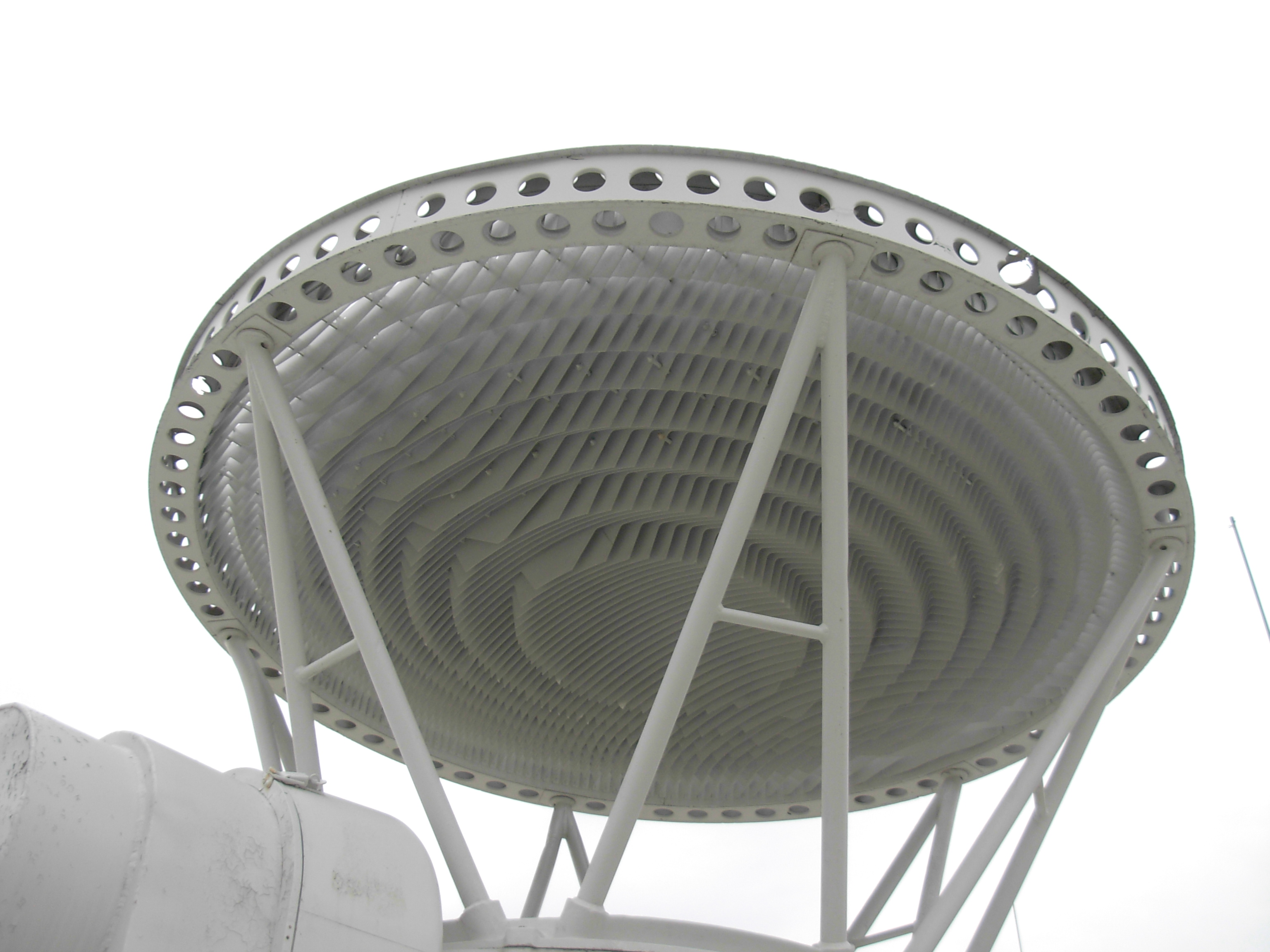
E-plane plate lens antenna of the target tracking radar for the US Air Force Nike Ajax anti-aircraft missile, 1954

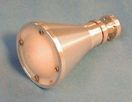
Dielectric lens/horn antenna in the Atacama Millimeter Array radio telescope

A lens antenna is a directional antenna that uses a shaped piece of microwave-transparent material to bend and focus microwaves by refraction, as an optical lens does for light. Typically it consists of a small feed antenna such as a patch antenna or horn antenna which radiates radio waves, with a piece of dielectric or composite material in front which functions as a converging lens to collimate the radio waves into a beam. Conversely, in a receiving antenna the lens focuses the incoming radio waves onto the feed antenna, which converts them to electric currents which are delivered to a radio receiver. They can also be fed by an array of feed antennas, called a focal plane array (FPA), to create more complicated radiation patterns.

To generate narrow beams, the lens must be much larger than the wavelength of the radio waves, so lens antennas are mainly used at the extreme high frequency end of the radio spectrum, with microwaves and millimeter waves, whose small wavelengths allow the antenna to be a manageable size. The lens can be made of a dielectric material like plastic, or a composite structure of metal plates or waveguides. Its principle of operation is the same as an optical lens: the microwaves have a different speed (phase velocity) within the lens material than in air, so that the varying lens thickness delays the microwaves passing through it by different amounts, changing the shape of the wavefront and the direction of the waves. Lens antennas can be classified into two types: delay lens antennas in which the microwaves travel slower in the lens material than in air, and fast lens antennas in which the microwaves travel faster in the lens material. As with optical lenses, geometric optics are used to design lens antennas, and the different shapes of lenses used in ordinary optics have analogues in microwave lenses.

Lens antennas have similarities to parabolic antennas and are used in similar applications. In both, microwaves emitted by a small feed antenna are shaped by a large optical surface into the desired final beam shape. They are used less than parabolic antennas due to chromatic aberration and absorption of microwave power by the lens material, their greater weight and bulk, and difficult fabrication and mounting. They are used as collimating elements in high gain microwave systems, such as satellite antennas, radio telescopes, and millimeter wave radar and are mounted in the apertures of horn antennas to increase gain.

== Types ==
Microwave lenses can be classified into two types by the propagation speed of the radio waves in the lens material:

- Delay lens (slow wave lens): in this type the radio waves travel slower in the lens medium than in free space; the index of refraction is greater than one, so the path length is increased by passing through the lens medium. This is similar to the action of an ordinary optical lens on light. Since thicker parts of the lens increase the path length, a convex lens is a converging lens which focuses radio waves, and a concave lens is a diverging lens which disperses radio waves, as in ordinary lenses. Delay lenses are constructed of

- Dielectric materials
- H-plane plate structures

- Fast lens (fast wave lens): in this type the radio waves travel faster in the lens medium than in free space, so the index of refraction is less than one, so the optical path length is decreased by passing through the lens medium. This type has no analog in ordinary optical materials, it occurs because the phase velocity of radio waves in waveguides can be greater than the speed of light. Since thicker parts of the lens decrease path length, a concave lens is a converging lens which focuses radio waves, and a convex lens is a diverging lens, the opposite of ordinary optical lenses. Fast lenses are constructed of

- E-plane plate structures
- Negative-index metamaterials

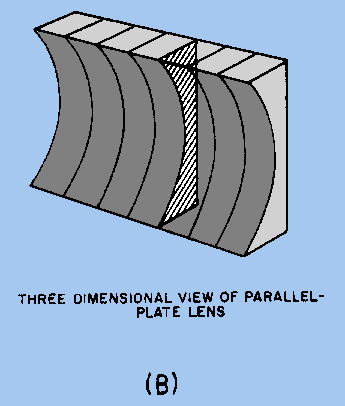

The main types of lens construction are:

- Natural dielectric lens - A lens made of a piece of dielectric material. Due to the longer wavelength, microwave lenses have much larger surface shape tolerances than optical lenses. Soft thermoplastics such as polystyrene, polyethylene, and plexiglass are often used, which can be molded or turned to the required shape. Most dielectric materials have significant attenuation and dispersion at microwave frequencies.
- Artificial dielectric lens - This simulates the properties of a dielectric at microwave wavelengths by a 3 dimensional array of small metal conductors, such as spheres, strips, discs or rings suspended in a nonconducting support medium

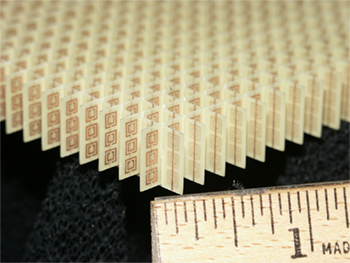
A metamaterial made of an array of split rings, to refract microwaves

- Constrained lens - a lens composed of metal leaves, ducts or other structures that control the direction of the microwaves. They are used with linearly polarized microwaves.

- E-plane metal plate lens - a lens made of closely spaced metal plates parallel to the plane of the electric or E field. This is a fast lens.
- H-plane metal plate lens - a lens made of closely spaced metal plates parallel to the plane of the magnetic or H field. This is a delay lens.
- Waveguide lens - A lens made of short sections of waveguide of different lengths

- Fresnel zone lens - A flat Fresnel zone plate, consisting of concentric annular sheet metal rings blocking out alternate Fresnel zones. It can be easily fabricated with copper foil shapes on a printed circuit board. This lens works by diffraction, not refraction. The microwaves passing through the spaces between the plates interfere constructively at the focal plane. It has large chromatic aberration and so is frequency-specific.
- Luneburg lens - A spherical dielectric lens with a stepped or graded index of refraction increasing toward the center. Luneburg lens antennas have several unique features: the focal point, and the feed antenna, is located at the surface of the lens, so it focuses all the radiation from the feed over a wide angle. It can be used with multiple feed antennas to create multiple beams.

Zoned lens - Microwave lenses, especially short wavelength designs, tend to be excessively thick. This increases weight, bulk, and power losses in dielectric lenses. To reduce thickness, lenses are often made with a zoned geometry, similar to a Fresnel lens. The lens is cut down to a uniform thickness in concentric annular (circular) steps, keeping the same surface angle. To keep the microwaves passing through different steps in phase, the height difference between steps must be an integral multiple of a wavelength. For this reason a zoned lens must be made for a specific frequency

== History ==
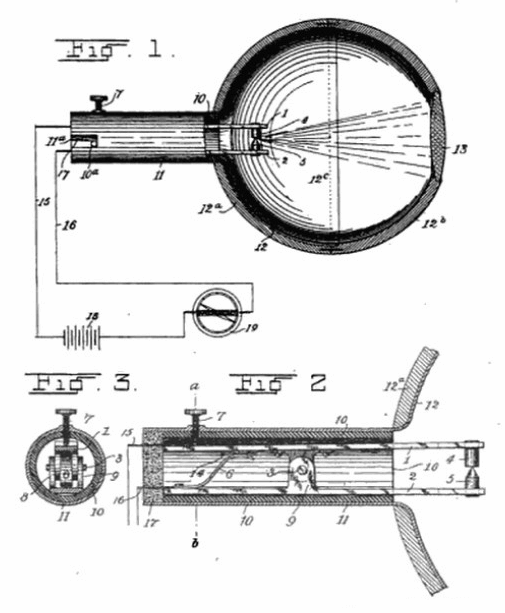
Bose's millimeter wave lens receiving antenna from his 1901 patent. This version was deliberately made to look and function like a human eyeball, with a glass lens focusing millimeter waves on a galena point contact detector.

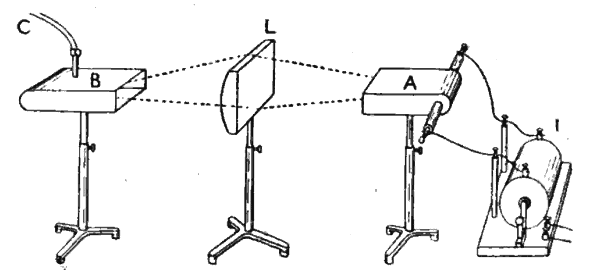
Experiment demonstrating refraction of 1.5 GHz (20 cm) microwaves by a paraffin lens, by John Ambrose Fleming in 1897, repeating earlier experiments by Bose, Lodge, and Righi. A spark gap transmitter (A), consisting of a dipole antenna made of two brass rods with a spark gap between them inside an open waveguide, powered by an induction coil (I) generates a beam of microwaves which is focused by the cylindrical paraffin lens (L) on a dipole receiving antenna in the lefthand waveguide (B) and detected by a coherer radio receiver (not shown), which rang a bell every time the transmitter was pulsed. Fleming demonstrated that the lens actually focused the waves by showing that when it was removed from the apparatus, the unfocused waves from the transmitter were too weak to activate the receiver.

The first experiments using lenses to refract and focus radio waves occurred during the earliest research on radio waves in the 1890s. In 1873 mathematical physicist James Clerk Maxwell in his electromagnetic theory, now called Maxwell's equations, predicted the existence of electromagnetic waves and proposed that light consisted of electromagnetic waves of very short wavelength. In 1887 Heinrich Hertz discovered radio waves, electromagnetic waves of longer wavelength. Early scientists thought of radio waves as a form of "invisible light". To test Maxwell's theory that light was electromagnetic waves, these researchers concentrated on duplicating classic optics experiments with short wavelength radio waves, diffracting them with wire diffraction gratings and refracting them with dielectric prisms and lenses of paraffin, pitch and sulfur. Hertz first demonstrated refraction of 450 MHz (66 cm) radio waves in 1887 using a 6-foot prism of pitch. These experiments among others confirmed that light and radio waves both consisted of the electromagnetic waves predicted by Maxwell, differing only in frequency.

The possibility of concentrating radio waves by focusing them into a beam like light waves interested many researchers of the time. In 1889 Oliver Lodge and James L. Howard attempted to refract 300 MHz (1 meter) waves with cylindrical lenses made of pitch, but failed to find a focusing effect because the apparatus was smaller than the wavelength. In 1894 Lodge successfully focused 4 GHz (7.5 cm) microwaves with a 23 cm glass lens. Beginning the same year, Indian physicist Jagadish Chandra Bose in his landmark 6–60 GHz (50–5 mm) microwave experiments may have been the first to construct lens antennas, using a 2.5 cm cylindrical sulfur lens in a waveguide to collimate the microwave beam from his spark oscillator, and patenting a receiving antenna consisting of a glass lens focusing microwaves on a galena crystal detector. Also in 1894 Augusto Righi in his microwave experiments at University of Bologna focused 12 GHz (2.5 cm) waves with 32 cm lenses of paraffin and sulfur.

However, microwaves were limited to line-of-sight propagation and could not travel beyond the horizon, and the low power microwave spark transmitters used had very short range. So the practical development of radio after 1897 used much lower frequencies, for which lens antennas were not suitable.

The development of modern lens antennas occurred during a great expansion of research into microwave technology around World War 2 to develop military radar. In 1946 R. K. Luneburg invented the Luneburg lens.
