= Fresnel imager =

Proposed ultra-lightweight design for a space telescope

A Fresnel imager is a proposed ultra-lightweight design for a space telescope that uses a Fresnel array as primary optics instead of a typical lens. It focuses light with a thin opaque foil sheet punctured with specially shaped holes, thus focusing light on a certain point by using the phenomenon of diffraction. Such patterned sheets, called Fresnel zone plates, have long been used for focusing laser beams, but have so far not been used for astronomy. No optical material is involved in the focusing process as in traditional telescopes. Rather, the light collected by the Fresnel array is concentrated on smaller classical optics (e.g. 1/20 of the array size), to form a final image.

The very long focal lengths of the Fresnel imager (a few kilometers) require operation by two-vessel formation flying in space at the L2 Sun-Earth Lagrangian point. In this two-spacecraft formation-flying instrument, one spacecraft holds the focussing element: the Fresnel interferometric array; the other spacecraft holds the field optics, focal instrumentation, and detectors.

== Advantages ==
- A Fresnel imager with a sheet of a given size has vision just as sharp as a traditional telescope with a mirror of the same size, though it collects about 10% of the light.
- The use of vacuum for the individual subapertures eliminates phase defects and spectral limitations, which would result from the use of a transparent or reflective material.
- It can observe in the ultraviolet and infrared, in addition to visible light.
- It achieves images of high contrast, enabling observation of a very faint object in the close vicinity of a bright one.
- Since it is constructed using foil instead of mirrors, it is expected to be more lightweight, and therefore less expensive to launch, than a traditional telescope.
- A 30-metre Fresnel imager would be powerful enough to see Earth-sized planets within 30 light years of Earth, and measure the planets' light spectrum to look for signs of life, such as atmospheric oxygen. The Fresnel imager could also measure the properties of very young galaxies in the distant universe and take detailed images of objects in the Solar System.

== Development ==
The concept has been successfully tested in the visible, and awaits testing in the UV. An international interest group is being formed, with specialists of the different science cases. A proposal for a 2025-2030 mission has been submitted to ESA Cosmic Vision call. In 2008 Laurent Koechlin of the Observatoire Midi-Pyrénées in Toulouse, France, and his team planned to construct a small ground-based Fresnel imager telescope by attaching a 20-centimetre patterned sheet to a telescope mount.

Koechlin and his team completed the ground-based prototype in 2012. It uses a piece of copper foil 20 cm square with 696 concentric rings as the zone plate. Its focal length is 18 metres. They were able to resolve the moons of Mars from the parent planet with it.

== See also ==
- Augustin-Jean Fresnel
- Diffraction
- Fresnel diffraction
- Fresnel lens
- Fresnel number
- Zone plate
- Photon sieve
