= Fraunhofer diffraction equation =

Mathematical explanation of far field diffraction

In optics, the Fraunhofer diffraction equation is used to model the diffraction of waves when the diffraction pattern is viewed at a long distance from the diffracting object, and also when it is viewed at the focal plane of an imaging lens.

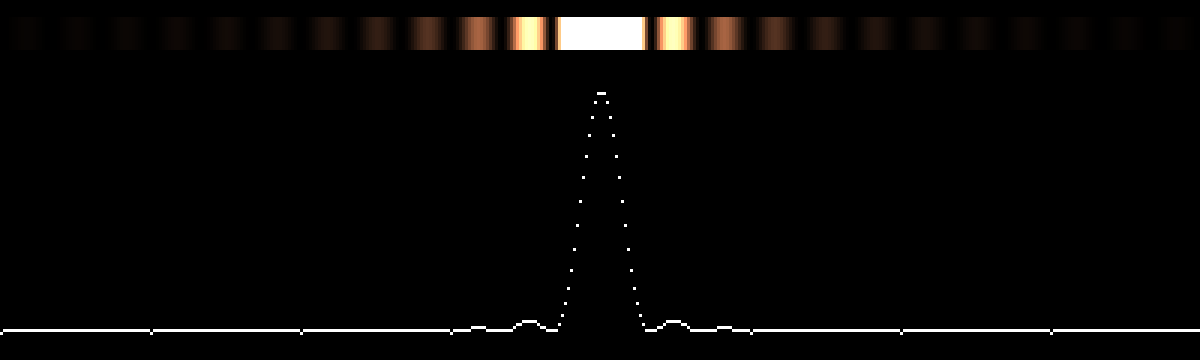
Computer generated Single Slit Diffraction Pattern by Fraunhofer diffraction formula

The equation was named in honour of Joseph von Fraunhofer although he was not actually involved in the development of the theory.

This article gives the equation in various mathematical forms, and provides detailed calculations of the Fraunhofer diffraction pattern for several different forms of diffracting apertures, specially for normally incident monochromatic plane wave. A qualitative discussion of Fraunhofer diffraction can be found elsewhere.

== Definition ==
When a beam of light is partly blocked by an obstacle, some of the light is scattered around the object, and light and dark bands are often seen at the edge of the shadow – this effect is known as diffraction. The Kirchhoff diffraction equation provides an expression, derived from the wave equation, which describes the wave diffracted by an aperture; analytical solutions to this equation are not available for most configurations.

The Fraunhofer diffraction equation is an approximation which can be applied when the diffracted wave is observed in the far field, and also when a lens is used to focus the diffracted light; in many instances, a simple analytical solution is available to the Fraunhofer equation – several of these are derived below.

=== In Cartesian coordinates ===
Diffraction geometry, showing aperture (or diffracting object) plane and image plane, with coordinate system

If the aperture is in x′y′ plane, with the origin in the aperture and is illuminated by a monochromatic wave, of wavelength λ, wavenumber k with complex amplitude A(x′,y′), and the diffracted wave is observed in the unprimed x,y-plane along the positive $z$-axis, where l,m are the direction cosines of the point x,y with respect to the origin. The complex amplitude U(x,y) of the diffracted wave is given by the Fraunhofer diffraction equation as:

$$\begin{align}
U(x,y,z)
&\propto \iint_\text{Aperture} \, A(x',y') e^{-i \frac{2\pi}{\lambda}(lx' + my')} \, dx'\,dy' \\
&\propto \iint_\text{Aperture} \, A(x',y') e^{-i k(lx' + my')} \, dx'\,dy'
\end{align}$$

It can be seen from this equation that the form of the diffraction pattern depends only on the direction of viewing, so the diffraction pattern changes in size but not in form with change of viewing distance.

Explicitly, the Fraunhofer diffraction equation is
$$\begin{align}
U(x,y,z)\approx  \frac{e^{ikz}e^{ik(x^2+y^2)/2z}}{i\lambda z}\iint_\text{Aperture} \,A(x',y') e^{-i \frac{k}{z}(x' x + y' y)}\,dx'\,dy'
\end{align}$$
where $k={2\pi}/{\lambda}$.

It can be seen that the integral in the above equations is the Fourier transform of the aperture function evaluated at frequencies.
$$\begin{align}
f_x &= x / (\lambda z) = l / \lambda \\
f_y &= y / (\lambda z) = m / \lambda
\end{align}$$

Thus, we can also write the equation in terms of a Fourier transform as:
$$U(x,y,z) \propto \hat f[A(x',y')]_{f_x f_y}$$
where Â is the Fourier transform of A. The Fourier transform formulation can be very useful in solving diffraction problems.

Another form is:

$$U(\mathbf r)\propto { \int_\text{Aperture} A(\mathbf {r'}) e^{-i\mathbf{k} \cdot (\mathbf{r'} -\mathbf r)} dr'}= { \int_\text{Aperture} a_0 (\mathbf{r'}) e^{i\mathbf{(k_0-k)} \cdot (\mathbf{r'}-\mathbf r)} dr' }$$

where r and r' represent the observation point and a point in the aperture respectively, k_{0} and k represent the wave vectors of the disturbance at the aperture and of the diffracted waves respectively, and a_{0}(r' ) represents the magnitude of the disturbance at the aperture.

=== In polar coordinates ===
When the diffracting aperture has circular symmetry, it is useful to use polar rather than Cartesian coordinates.

A point in the aperture has coordinates ρ,ω giving:
$$x'=\rho' \cos \omega'; y'=\rho' \sin \omega'$$
and
$$x=\rho \cos \omega; y=\rho \sin \omega$$

The complex amplitude at ρ' is given by A(ρ), and the area dx dy converts to ρ′ dρ′ dω′, giving
$$\begin{align}
U(\rho,\omega,z)
&\propto \int_0^\infty \int_0^{2 \pi} A(\rho') e^{-i \frac{2\pi}{\lambda z}(\rho \rho' \cos \omega \cos \omega' + \rho \rho' \sin \omega \sin \omega' )} \rho' d \rho' d \omega'\\
&\propto \int_0^{2 \pi} \int_0^\infty A(\rho') e^{-i \frac{2\pi}{\lambda z}\rho \rho' \cos (\omega - \omega') } \, d \omega' \rho' \, d \rho'
\end{align}$$

Using the integral representation of the Bessel function:
$$J_0(p)=\frac {1}{2 \pi} \int_0^{2 \pi} e^{ip \cos \alpha} \, d \alpha$$
we have
$$U(\rho,z)
\propto 2 \pi \int_0^\infty A(\rho') J_0\left(\frac{2 \pi \rho' \rho}{\lambda z} \right) \rho' \, d \rho'$$

where the integration over ω gives 2π since the equation is circularly symmetric, i.e. there is no dependence on ω.

In this case, we have U(ρ,z) equal to the Fourier–Bessel or Hankel transform of the aperture function, A(ρ)

== Example ==
Here are given examples of Fraunhofer diffraction with a normally incident monochromatic plane wave.

In each case, the diffracting object is located in the z = 0 plane, and the complex amplitude of the incident plane wave is given by
$$A(x',y')= a e^{i 2 \pi c t/\lambda} = a e^{i k c t}$$
where

- a is the magnitude of the wave disturbance,
- λ is the wavelength,
- c is the velocity of light,
- t is the time
- k = 2π/λ is the wave number

and the phase is zero at time t = 0.

The time dependent factor is omitted throughout the calculations, as it remains constant, and is averaged out when the intensity is calculated. The intensity at r is proportional to the amplitude times its complex conjugate
$$I(\mathbf{r}) \propto U(\mathbf{r}) \overline{U} (\mathbf{r})$$

These derivations can be found in most standard optics books, in slightly different forms using varying notations. A reference is given for each of the systems modelled here. The Fourier transforms used can be found here.

=== Narrow rectangular slit ===
Graph and image of single-slit diffraction

The aperture is a slit of width W which is located along the y-axis,

==== Solution by integration ====
Assuming the centre of the slit is located at x = 0, the first equation above, for all values of y, is:
$$\begin{align}
U(x,z)
&= a \int_ {-W/2}^{W/2} e^{ {-2 \pi ixx'}/(\lambda z)} \, dx'\\[4pt]
&= -\frac{a \lambda z}{2 \pi i x} \left[ e^{ {-2 \pi ixx'}/(\lambda z)} \right]_{-W/2}^{W/2}
\end{align}$$

Using Euler's formula, this can be simplified to:
$$\begin{align}
U(x,z)
&= aW \frac {\sin \left [\frac {\pi Wx} {\lambda z} \right ]} {\frac {\pi Wx} {\lambda z}}\\
&= aW \operatorname{sinc} \frac {\pi Wx}{\lambda z}
\end{align}$$

where sinc(p) = sin(p)/p. The sinc function is sometimes defined as sin(πp)/πp and this may cause confusion when looking at derivations in different texts.

This can also be written as:
$$U(\theta) = aW \operatorname {sinc} \left [\frac {\pi W \sin \theta} {\lambda} \right]$$
where θ is the angle between z-axis and the line joining x to the origin and sin θ ≈ x/z when θ << 1.

==== Fourier transform solution ====
The slit can be represented by the rect function as:
$$\operatorname{rect}\left( \frac x W \right)$$

The Fourier transform of this function is given by
$$\hat f(\operatorname{rect}(ax)) = \frac 1 {|a|} \cdot \operatorname{sinc}\left(\frac \xi a \right)$$
where ξ is the Fourier transform frequency, and the sinc function is here defined as sin(πx)/(πx)

The Fourier transform frequency here is x/λz, giving
$$\begin{align}
U(x,z)
& \propto W \frac {\sin{ \frac {\pi Wx} {\lambda z}}}{ \frac {\pi Wx} {\lambda z}}\\
& \propto W \operatorname{sinc} { \frac {\pi Wx} {\lambda z}}\\
& \propto W \operatorname{sinc} { \frac { \pi W \sin \theta} {\lambda }} \\
& \propto W \operatorname{sinc} (kW \sin \theta /2)
\end{align}$$

Note that the sinc function is here defined as sin(x)/(x) to maintain consistency.

==== Intensity ====
The intensity is proportional to the square of the amplitude, and is therefore
$$\begin{align}
I(\theta)
&\propto \operatorname{sinc}^2 \left [\frac { \pi W \sin \theta} \lambda \right] \\
&\propto \operatorname{sinc}^2 \left [\frac {kW \sin \theta} 2 \right]
\end{align}$$

== Apertures ==
=== Rectangular aperture ===
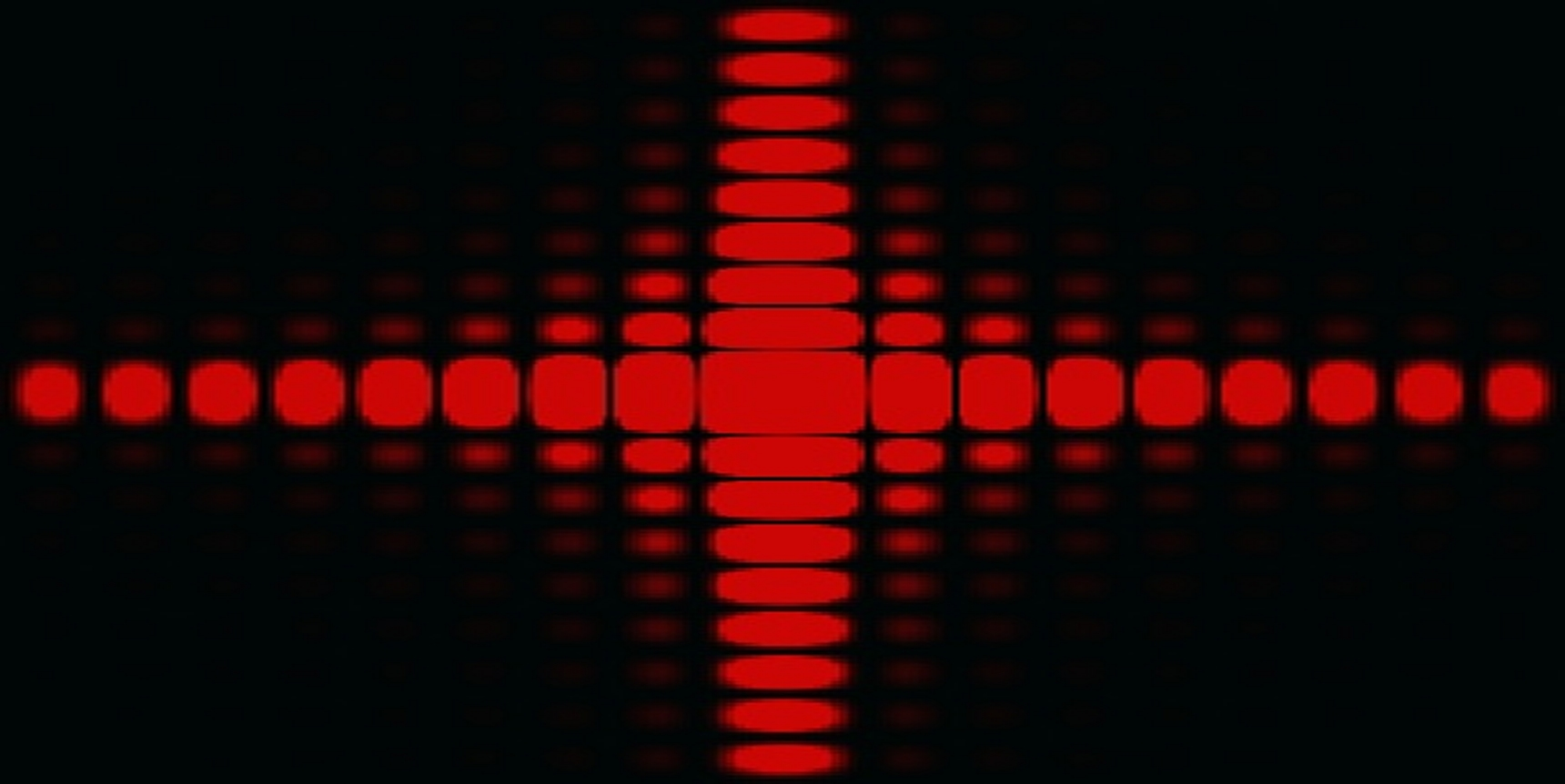
Computer simulation of Fraunhofer diffraction by a rectangular aperture

When a rectangular slit of width W and height H is illuminated normally (the slit illuminated at the normal angle) by a monochromatic plane wave of wavelength λ, the complex amplitude can be found using similar analyses to those in the previous section, applied over two independent orthogonal dimensions as:

$$\begin{align}
U(x, y)
&\propto \operatorname{sinc}\left(\frac{\pi W x}{\lambda R}\right)\operatorname{sinc}\left(\frac{\pi H y}{\lambda R}\right) \\
&\propto \operatorname{sinc}\left(\frac{k W x}{2 R}\right)\operatorname{sinc}\left(\frac{k H y}{2 R}\right).
\end{align}$$

The intensity is given by
$$\begin{align}
I(x, y)
& \propto \operatorname{sinc}^2\left(\frac{\pi W x}{\lambda R}\right)\operatorname{sinc}^2\left(\frac{ \pi H y}{\lambda R}\right)\\
& \propto \operatorname{sinc}^2\left(\frac{k W x}{2 R}\right)\operatorname{sinc}^2\left(\frac{k H y}{2 R}\right)
\end{align}$$

where the x and y axes define the transverse directions on the plane of observation or the image plane (described in the above figure), and R is the distance between the slit center and the point of observation $P = (x,y)$ on the image plane.

In practice, all slits are of finite size so produce diffraction on the both transverse directions, along the x (width W defined) and y (height H defined) axes. If the height H of the slit is much greater than its width W, then the spacing of the vertical (along the height or the y axis) diffraction fringes is much less than the spacing of the horizontal (along the width or x axis) fringes. If the vertical fringe spacing is so less by a relatively so large H, then the observation of the vertical fringes is so hard that a person observing the diffracted wave intensity pattern on the plane of observation or the image plane recognizes only the horizontal fringes with their narrow height. This is the reason why a height-long slit or slit array such as a diffraction grating is typically analyzed only in the dimension along the width. If the illuminating beam does not illuminate the whole height of the slit, then the spacing of the vertical fringes is determined by the dimension of the laser beam along the slit height. Close examination of the two-slit pattern below shows that there are very fine vertical diffraction fringes above and below the main spots, as well as the more obvious horizontal fringes.

=== Circular aperture ===
Airy diffraction pattern

The aperture has diameter W. The complex amplitude in the observation plane is given by

$$U(\rho,z) = 2 \pi a \int_0^{W/2} J_0\left( \frac{2\pi\rho'\rho}{\lambda z}\right) \rho' \, d \rho'$$

==== Solution by integration ====
Using the recurrence relationship
$$\frac {d} {dx} \left[x^{n+1}J_{n+1}(x) \right] = x^{n+1} J_n(x)$$
to give
$$\int_0^x x'J_0(x') \, dx' = xJ_1(x)$$

If we substitute
$$x'= \frac{2 \pi \rho}{\lambda z} \rho'$$
and the limits of the integration become 0 and πρW/λz, we get
$$U(\rho,z) \propto \frac{J_1(\pi W \rho/ \lambda z)}{\pi W \rho / \lambda z}$$

Putting ρ/z = sin θ, we get
$$U(\theta) \propto \frac{J_1(\pi W \sin \theta/ \lambda)}{\pi W \sin \theta / \lambda}$$

==== Solution using Fourier–Bessel transform ====
We can write the aperture function as a step function
$$\Pi (W/2)$$

The Fourier–Bessel transform for this function is given by the relationship
$$F[\Pi(r/a)] = \frac {2 \pi J_1 (qa)} {q}$$
where q/2π is the transform frequency which is equal to ρ/λz and a = W/2.

Thus, we get
$$\begin{align}
U(\rho)
&= \frac { 2 \pi J_1(\pi W \rho / \lambda z)}{2 \pi W \rho/\lambda z}\\
&= \frac { 2 \pi J_1(\pi W \sin \theta /\lambda)}{W \sin \theta/\lambda}\\
&= \frac { 2 \pi J_1(k W \sin \theta /2)}{ kW \sin \theta/2}
\end{align}$$

==== Intensity ====
The intensity is given by:
$$\begin{align}
I(\theta)
&\propto \left [\frac{J_1(\pi W \sin \theta/ \lambda)}{(\pi W \sin \theta/\lambda)} \right]^2 \\
&\propto \left [\frac{J_1(k W \sin \theta/2)}{(k W \sin \theta/2)} \right]^2
\end{align}$$

==== Form of the diffraction pattern ====
This known as the Airy diffraction pattern

The diffracted pattern is symmetric about the normal axis.

=== Aperture with a Gaussian profile ===
Intensity of a plane wave diffracted through an aperture with a Gaussian profile

An aperture with a Gaussian profile, for example, a photographic slide whose transmission has a Gaussian variation, so that the amplitude at a point in the aperture located at a distance r' from the origin is given by

$$A(\rho') = \exp{\left( - \left [ \frac {\rho'} {\sigma} \right]^2 \right )}$$
giving
$$U(\rho,z)=2 \pi \int_0^\infty \exp{ \left ( - \left [\frac {\rho'} {\sigma} \right]^2 \right ) } J_0{\left(\frac{2 \pi \rho' \rho}{\lambda z}\right)} \rho' \, d \rho'$$

==== Solution using Fourier–Bessel transform ====
The Fourier–Bessel or Hankel transform is defined as
$$F_\nu(k) = \int_0^\infty f(r) J_\nu(kr)\,r\,dr$$
where J_{ν} is the Bessel function of the first kind of order ν with ν ≥ −1/2.

The Hankel transform is
$$F_\nu {\left[e^{(ar)^2/2}\right]} = \frac {e^{-k^2/2a^2}}{a^2}$$
giving
$$U(\rho,z) \propto e^{-\left[\frac{\pi \rho \sigma}{\lambda z}\right]^2}$$
and
$$U(\theta) \propto e^{-\left[\frac{\pi \sigma \sin \theta}{\lambda}\right]^2}$$

==== Intensity ====
The intensity is given by:
$$I(\theta) \propto e^{-\frac{2\pi^2 \sigma^2 \sin^2 \theta}{\lambda^2}}$$

This function is plotted on the right, and it can be seen that, unlike the diffraction patterns produced by rectangular or circular apertures, it has no secondary rings. This can be used in a process called apodization - the aperture is covered by a filter whose transmission varies as a Gaussian function, giving a diffraction pattern with no secondary rings.

== Slits ==
=== Two slits ===
The pattern which occurs when light diffracted from two slits overlaps is of considerable interest in physics: firstly for its importance in establishing the wave theory of light through Young's interference experiment, and secondly because of its role as a thought experiment in the double-slit experiment in quantum mechanics.

==== Narrow slits ====
Geometry of two slit diffraction

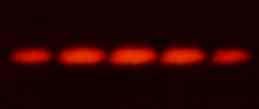
Two slit interference using a red laser

Assume we have two long slits illuminated by a plane wave of wavelength λ. The slits are in the z = 0 plane, parallel to the y axis, separated by a distance S and are symmetrical about the origin. The width of the slits is small compared with the wavelength.

==== Solution by integration ====
The incident light is diffracted by the slits into uniform spherical waves. The waves travelling in a given direction θ from the two slits have differing phases. The phase of the waves from the upper and lower slits relative to the origin is given by (2π/λ)(S/2)sin θ and −(2π/λ)(S/2)sin θ

The complex amplitude of the summed waves is given by:
$$\begin{align}
U(\theta)
&= a e^{\frac { i\pi S \sin \theta }{\lambda}} + a e^{- \frac { i \pi S \sin \theta} {\lambda}}\\
&= a \left(\cos {\frac { \pi S \sin \theta }{\lambda}} + i \sin {\frac { \pi S \sin \theta }{\lambda}} \right)+a \left(\cos {\frac { \pi S \sin \theta }{\lambda}} -i \sin {\frac { \pi S \sin \theta }{\lambda}} \right)\\
&= 2a \cos {\frac { \pi S \sin \theta }{\lambda}}
\end{align}$$

==== Solution using Fourier transform ====
The aperture can be represented by the function:
$$a[\delta {(x-S/2)}+ \delta {(x+S/2)}]$$
where δ is the delta function.

We have
$$\hat {f}[\delta (x)] =1$$
and
$$\hat {f} [g(x-a)] = e^{-2 \pi i a f_x} \hat {f} [g(x)]$$
giving
$$\begin{align}
U(x,z)
&=\hat {f} [\delta {(x-S/2)}+ \delta {(x+S/2)}]\\
&= e^{- i \pi Sx/2 \lambda }+e^{ i \pi Sx/2 \lambda}\\
&= 2 \cos \frac {\pi S x}{2 \lambda}
\end{align}$$

$$U(\theta)= 2 \cos \frac {\pi S \sin \theta} {2 \lambda}$$

This is the same expression as that derived above by integration.

==== Intensity ====
This gives the intensity of the combined waves as:
$$\begin{align}
I(\theta)
& \propto \cos^2 \left[\frac { \pi S \sin \theta}{\lambda} \right] \\
& \propto \cos^2 {\left[ \frac {kS \sin \theta}{2}\right]}
\end{align}$$

=== Slits of finite width ===
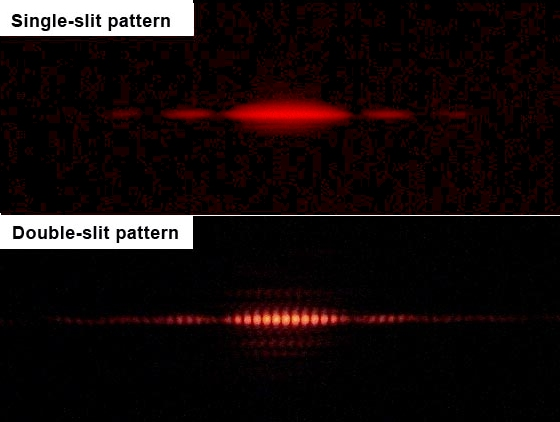
Single and double slit diffraction – slit separation is 0.7mm and the slit width is 0.1mm.

The width of the slits, W is finite.

==== Solution by integration ====
The diffracted pattern is given by:
$$\begin{align}
U(\theta)
&= a \left [e^{\frac { i\pi S \sin \theta }{\lambda}} + e^{- \frac { i \pi S \sin \theta} {\lambda}} \right] \int_ {-W/2}^{W/2} e^{ {-2 \pi ix' \sin \theta} / \lambda} \, dx'\\[1ex]
&= 2a \cos {\frac { \pi S \sin \theta }{\lambda}} W \operatorname{sinc} \frac { \pi W \sin \theta}{\lambda}
\end{align}$$

==== Solution using Fourier transform ====
The aperture function is given by:
$$a \left[\operatorname {rect} \left (\frac{x-S/2}{W} \right) + \operatorname {rect} \left (\frac{x+S/2}{W} \right) \right]$$

The Fourier transform of this function is given by
$$\hat f(\operatorname{rect}(ax)) = \frac 1 {|a|} \cdot \operatorname{sinc}\left(\frac{\xi}{2a}\right)$$
where ξ is the Fourier transform frequency, and the sinc function is here defined as sin(πx)/(πx) and
$$\hat {f} [g(x-a)] = e^{-2 \pi i a f_x} \hat {f} [g(x)]$$

We have
$$\begin{align}
U(x,z)
&= \hat {f} \left [a \left[\operatorname {rect} \left (\frac{x-S/2}{W} \right) + \operatorname {rect} \left (\frac{x+S/2}{W} \right) \right ] \right ]\\
&= 2W \left[ e^{- i \pi Sx/\lambda z}+e^{ i \pi Sx/\lambda z} \right] \frac {\sin { \frac {\pi Wx} {\lambda z}}}{ \frac {\pi Wx} {\lambda z}}\\
&= 2a \cos {\frac { \pi S x }{\lambda z}} W \operatorname{sinc} \frac { \pi Wx}{\lambda z}
\end{align}$$
or
$$U(\theta)= 2a \cos {\frac { \pi S \sin \theta } \lambda} W \operatorname{sinc} \frac { \pi W \sin \theta} \lambda$$

This is the same expression as was derived by integration.

==== Intensity ====
The intensity is given by:
$$\begin{align}
I(\theta)
&\propto \cos^2 \left [ \frac {\pi S \sin \theta} \lambda \right] \operatorname{sinc}^2 \left [ \frac {\pi W \sin \theta}\lambda \right]\\
&\propto \cos^2 \left [\frac{k S \sin \theta} 2 \right] \operatorname{sinc}^2 \left [ \frac {kW \sin \theta}{2} \right]
\end{align}$$

It can be seen that the form of the intensity pattern is the product of the individual slit diffraction pattern, and the interference pattern which would be obtained with slits of negligible width. This is illustrated in the image at the right which shows single slit diffraction by a laser beam, and also the diffraction/interference pattern given by two identical slits.

== Gratings ==
A grating is defined in Principles of Optics by Born and Wolf as "any arrangement which imposes on an incident wave a periodic variation of amplitude or phase, or both".

=== Narrow slit grating ===
A simple grating consists of a screen with N slits whose width is significantly less than the wavelength of the incident light with slit separation of S.

==== Solution by integration ====
The complex amplitude of the diffracted wave at an angle θ is given by:
$$\begin{align}
U(\theta)
&= a\sum_{n=1}^N e^{ \frac {-i 2 \pi nS \sin \theta} {\lambda}} \\
&= \frac {1-e^{ -i 2 \pi NS \sin \theta/\lambda}} {1-e^{-i 2 \pi S \sin \theta / \lambda}}
\end{align}$$

since this is the sum of a geometric series.

==== Solution using Fourier transform ====
The aperture is given by
$$\sum _{n=0}^{N} \delta(x-nS)$$

The Fourier transform of this function is:
$$\begin{align}
\hat {f} \left[\sum _{n=0}^{N} \delta(x-nS) \right]
&= \sum _{n=0}^{N} e^{-i f_x nS}\\
&= \frac {1-e^{ -i 2 \pi NS \sin \theta/\lambda}} {1-e^{-i 2 \pi S \sin \theta / \lambda}}
\end{align}$$

==== Intensity ====
Diffraction pattern for 50 narrow-slit grating

Detail of main maximum in 20 and 50 narrow slit grating diffraction patterns

The intensity is given by:

$$\begin{align}
I(\theta)
&\propto \frac {1 - \cos (2 \pi N S\sin \theta/\lambda)}{1-\cos (2 \pi S \sin \theta / \lambda)} \\
&\propto \frac{ \sin^2 (\pi N S \sin \theta/\lambda)}{ \sin^2 (\pi S \sin \theta/\lambda)}
\end{align}$$

This function has a series of maxima and minima. There are regularly spaced "principal maxima", and a number of much smaller maxima in between the principal maxima. The principal maxima occur when
$$\pi S \sin_n \theta/\lambda =n \pi, n = 0, \pm 1, \pm 2,\ldots$$
and the main diffracted beams therefore occur at angles:
$$\sin \theta_n = \frac {n \lambda} {S}, n=0, \pm 1 \pm 2, \ldots$$

This is the grating equation for normally incident light.

The number of small intermediate maxima is equal to the number of slits, N − 1 and their size and shape is also determined by N.

The form of the pattern for N=50 is shown in the first figure .

The detailed structure for 20 and 50 slits gratings are illustrated in the second diagram.

=== Finite width slit grating ===
Diffraction pattern from grating with finite width slits

The grating now has N slits of width W and spacing S

==== Solution using integration ====
The amplitude is given by:
$$\begin{align}
U(\theta, \phi)
&\propto a\sum_{n=1}^N e^{ \frac {-i 2 \pi nS \sin \theta} \lambda}\int_{-W/2}^{W/2} e^{ {-2 \pi ixx'}/(\lambda z)} \,dx' \\
&\propto a\operatorname{sinc}\left(\frac{ \pi W \sin\theta}{\lambda}\right)\frac {1-e^{ -i 2 \pi NS \sin \theta/\lambda}} {1-e^{-i 2 \pi S \sin \theta / \lambda}}
\end{align}$$

==== Solution using Fourier transform ====
The aperture function can be written as:
$$\sum_{n=1}^N \operatorname {rect} \left[ \frac {x'-nS} W \right]$$

Using the convolution theorem, which says that if we have two functions f(x) and g(x), and we have
$$h(x) = (f*g)(x) = \int_{-\infty}^\infty f(y)g(x - y)\,dy,$$
where ∗ denotes the convolution operation, then we also have
$$\hat{h}(\xi) = \hat{f}(\xi)\cdot \hat{g}(\xi).$$
we can write the aperture function as
$$\operatorname {rect} (x'/W)* \sum_{n=0}^N \delta (x'-nS)$$

The amplitude is then given by the Fourier transform of this expression as:
$$\begin{align}
U(x,z)
&= \hat {f} [\operatorname {rect} (x'/W)] \hat {f} \left[ \sum_{n=0}^N \delta (x'-nS) \right]\\
&= a\operatorname{sinc}\left(\frac{ W \sin\theta} \lambda \right)\frac {1-e^{ -i 2 \pi NS \sin \theta/\lambda}} {1-e^{-i 2 \pi S \sin \theta / \lambda}}
\end{align}$$

==== Intensity ====
The intensity is given by:
$$I(\theta) \propto
\operatorname{sinc}^2\left(\frac{\pi W \sin\theta}{\lambda}\right)\frac{ \sin^2 (\pi N S \sin \theta/\lambda)}{ \sin^2 (\pi S \sin \theta/\lambda)}$$

The diagram shows the diffraction pattern for a grating with 20 slits, where the width of the slits is 1/5th of the slit separation. The size of the main diffracted peaks is modulated with the diffraction pattern of the individual slits.

=== Other gratings ===
The Fourier transform method above can be used to find the form of the diffraction for any periodic structure where the Fourier transform of the structure is known. Goodman uses this method to derive expressions for the diffraction pattern obtained with sinusoidal amplitude and phase modulation gratings. These are of particular interest in holography.

== Extensions ==
=== Non-normal illumination ===
If the aperture is illuminated by a monochromatic plane wave incident in a direction (l_{0},m_{0}, n_{0}), the first version of the Fraunhofer equation above becomes:
$$\begin{align}
U(x,y,z)
&\propto \iint_\text{Aperture} \,A(x',y') e^{-i \frac{2\pi}{\lambda}\left[(l-l_0)x' + (m-m_0)y'\right]} \, dx'\,dy' \\
&\propto \iint_\text{Aperture} \,A(x',y') e^{-i k\left[(l-l_0)x' + (m-m_0)y'\right]}\,dx'\,dy'
\end{align}$$

The equations used to model each of the systems above are altered only by changes in the constants multiplying x and y, so the diffracted light patterns will have the form, except that they will now be centred around the direction of the incident plane wave.

The grating equation becomes
$$\sin \theta_n = \frac {n \lambda} {S} + \sin \theta_0, n=0, \pm1, \pm2, \ldots$$

=== Non-monochromatic illumination ===
In all of the above examples of Fraunhofer diffraction, the effect of increasing the wavelength of the illuminating light is to reduce the size of the diffraction structure, and conversely, when the wavelength is reduced, the size of the pattern increases. If the light is not mono-chromatic, i.e. it consists of a range of different wavelengths, each wavelength is diffracted into a pattern of a slightly different size to its neighbours. If the spread of wavelengths is significantly smaller than the mean wavelength, the individual patterns will vary very little in size, and so the basic diffraction will still appear with slightly reduced contrast. As the spread of wavelengths is increased, the number of "fringes" which can be observed is reduced.

== See also ==
- Kirchhoff's diffraction formula
- Fresnel diffraction
- Huygens principle
- Airy disc
- Fourier optics
