= Fresnel number =

Optical property

In optics, in particular scalar diffraction theory, the Fresnel number (F), named after the physicist Augustin-Jean Fresnel, is a dimensionless number relating to the pattern a beam of light forms on a surface when projected through an aperture.

== Definition ==
For an electromagnetic wave passing through an aperture and hitting a screen, the Fresnel number F is defined as
$$F = \frac{a^2}{L \lambda},$$
where

$a$ is the characteristic size (e.g. radius) of the aperture,
$L$ is the distance of the screen from the aperture,
$\lambda$ is the incident wavelength.

Conceptually, it is the number of half-period zones in the wavefront amplitude, counted from the center to the edge of the aperture, as seen from the observation point (the center of the imaging screen), where a half-period zone is defined so that the wavefront phase changes by $\pi$ when moving from one half-period zone to the next.

An equivalent definition is that the Fresnel number is the difference, expressed in half-wavelengths, between the slant distance from the observation point to the edge of the aperture and the orthogonal distance from the observation point to the center of the aperture.

== Application ==
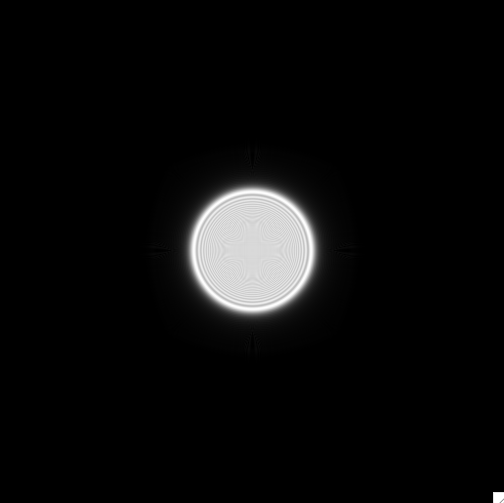
Aperture real amplitude as estimated at focus of a half inch (12.7 mm) perfect lens having Fresnel number equal to 100. Adopted wavelength for propagation is 1 μm.

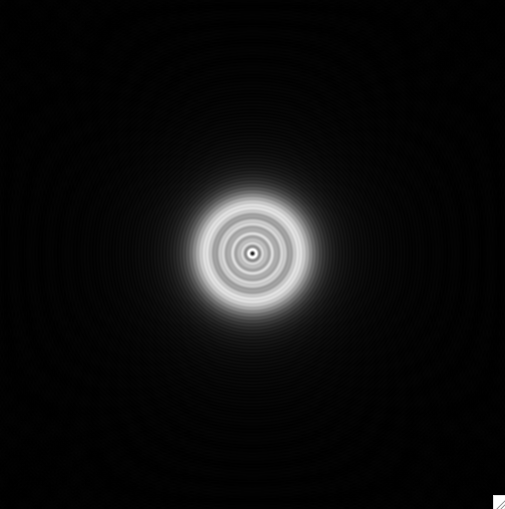
Aperture real amplitude as estimated at focus of the same lens having Fresnel number equal to 1. Adopted wavelength for propagation is 1 μm.

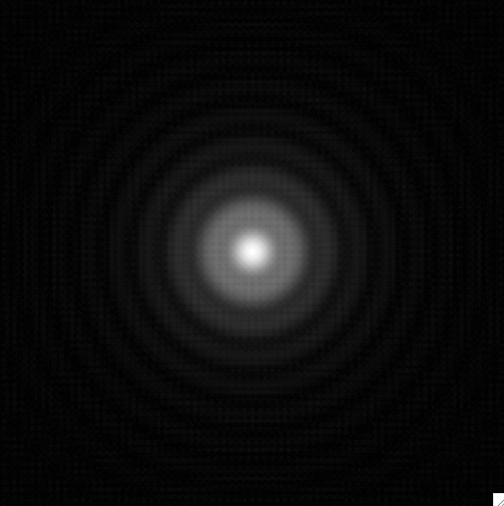
Aperture real amplitude as estimated at focus of the same lens having Fresnel number equal to 0.01. Adopted wavelength for propagation is 1 μm.

In physical optics, the Fresnel number is commonly used as a rule-of-thumb parameter indicating how strongly the wavefront curvature across an aperture influences the observed field. The Fresnel number establishes a coarse criterion to define the near- and far-field approximations. Essentially, if Fresnel number is small (less than roughly 1), the beam is said to be in the far field. If Fresnel number is larger than 1, the beam is said to be near field. The Fresnel number is a coarse classification based only on geometry, not a direct measurement of the wavefront at the observation plane.

For propagation between parallel planes in a homogeneous medium, the angular spectrum method provides a solution of the scalar Helmholtz equation for the field and is applicable to all Fresnel numbers.

$F \gtrsim 1$ is often associated with the near-field (Fresnel) regime, where the diffraction pattern evolves noticeably with propagation distance and the Fresnel diffraction (paraxial) integral is commonly used.

$F \ll 1$ is often associated with the far-field (Fraunhofer) regime, where the Fraunhofer diffraction approximation applies. In this regime, the field is closely related to the spatial Fourier transform of the aperture field (up to scaling and phase factors).

In numerical calculations, angular-spectrum and related convolution-based propagators typically impose sampling constraints and may require zero padding or enlarged computational windows to avoid wrap-around and aliasing errors, increasing memory use and runtime; when applicable, Fresnel or Fraunhofer approximations are often used for efficiency.

=== Gaussian pilot beam ===
Another criterion called Gaussian pilot beam allowing to define far- and near-field conditions consists in measuring the actual wavefront surface curvature for an unaberrated system. In this case the wavefront is planar at the aperture position, when the beam is collimated, or at its focus when the beam is converging/diverging. In detail, within a certain distance from the aperture – the near field – the amount of wavefront curvature is low. Outside this distance – the far field – the amount of wavefront curvature is high. This concept applies equivalently close to the focus.

This criterion, firstly described by G. N. Lawrence and now adopted in propagation codes like PROPER, allows one to determine the realm of application of near- and far-field approximations taking into account the actual wavefront surface shape at the observation point, to sample its phase without aliasing. This criterion is named Gaussian pilot beam and fixes the best propagation method (among angular spectrum, Fresnel and Fraunhofer diffraction) by looking at the behavior of a Gaussian beam piloted from the aperture position and the observation position.

Near/far-field approximations are fixed by the analytical calculation of the Gaussian beam Rayleigh length and by its comparison with the input/output propagation distance. If the ratio between input/output propagation distance and Rayleigh length returns $\le 1,$ the surface wavefront maintains itself nearly flat along its path, which means that no sampling rescaling is requested for the phase measurement. In this case the beam is said to be near field at the observation point, and angular spectrum method is adopted for the propagation. On the contrary, once the ratio between input/output propagation distance and Gaussian pilot beam Rayleigh range yields $> 1$ the surface wavefront gets curvature along the path. In this case a rescaling of the sampling is mandatory for a measurement of the phase to prevent aliasing. The beam is said to be far field at the observation point, and Fresnel diffraction is adopted for the propagation. Fraunhofer diffraction returns then to be an asymptotic case that applies only when the input/output propagation distance is large enough to consider the quadratic phase term within the Fresnel diffraction integral negligible irrespectively to the actual curvature of the wavefront at the observation point.

As the figures explain, the Gaussian pilot beam criterion allows describing the diffractive propagation for all the near/far-field approximation cases set by the coarse criterion based on Fresnel number.

=== Fresnel number of self-imaging optical cavities ===
The two remarkable optical laser resonators have distinct remarkable values of their Fresnel numbers:

1. Confocal laser cavity composed in the simplest case of the two parabolic mirrors with focal lengths $f1$ and $f2$ located on a cavity axis and separated by distance $f1 + f2$:

F=1

2. Talbot laser cavity composed in the simplest case of the \it two flat mirrors on a cavity axis and separated by Talbot distance.

The number of Fresnel zones $F$ that form first Talbot self-image of the grating with period $p$ and transverse size $N \cdot p$ is given by exact formula:

$F= (N-1)^2$.

This result is obtained via exact evaluation of Fresnel-Kirchhoff integral in the near field at distance $z_\text{T} = \frac{2 p^2}{\lambda}$.

== See also ==
- Fraunhofer distance
- Fresnel diffraction
- Fresnel imager
- Fresnel integral
- Fresnel zone
- Near and far field
- Talbot effect
- Zone plate

== Bibliography ==
- Jenkins, Francis Arthur; White, Harvey Elliott (1957). Fundamentals of optics (3rd ed.). New York: McGraw-Hill.
- Krist, J.E. (September 2007). "PROPER: An optical propagation library for IDL". In Kahan, Mark A (ed.). Proceedings Optical Modeling and Performance Predictions III. Vol. 6675, art. 66750P. Bibcode:2007SPIE.6675E..0PK. doi:10.1117/12.731179. S2CID 119742001.
- Born, M.; Wolf, E. (2000). Principles of optics (7th Expanded ed.). Cambridge University Press. p. 486.
- Lawrence, G.N. (1992). "Optical Modeling". Applied Optics and Optical Engineering. 11: 125.
- Goodman, J.W. (2005). Introduction to Fourier optics (3rd ed.). New York: McGraw-Hill.
- Okulov, A.Yu. (2000). "Soliton Laser: Geometry and Stability". Optics and Spectroscopy. 89: 131-133. doi:10.1134/BF03356001.
- Okulov, A.Yu. (1990). "Two-dimensional periodic structures in nonlinear resonator". JOSA B. 7 (6): 1045–1050. doi:10.1364/JOSAB.7.001045.
- Okulov, A.Yu. (1993). "Scaling of diode-array-pumped solid-state lasers via self-imaging". Opt. Commun. 99 (5–6): 350–354. Bibcode:1993OptCo..99..350O. doi:10.1016/0030-4018(93)90342-3.
