= Fresnel zone antenna =

Antenna based on the concept of Fresnel zone

Fresnel zone antennas are antennas that focus the signal by using the phase shifting property of the antenna surface or its shape. There are several types of Fresnel zone antennas, namely, Fresnel zone plate, offset Fresnel zone plate antennas, phase correcting reflective array or "Reflectarray" antennas and 3 Dimensional Fresnel antennas. They are a class of diffractive antennas and have been used from radio frequencies to X-rays.

== Fresnel antenna ==
Fresnel zone antennas belong to the category of reflector and lens antennas. Unlike traditional reflector and lens antennas, however, the focusing effect in a Fresnel zone antenna is achieved by controlling the phase shifting property of the surface and allows for flat or arbitrary antenna shapes. For historical reasons, a flat Fresnel zone antenna is termed a Fresnel zone plate antenna. An offset Fresnel zone plate can be flush mounted to the wall or roof of a building, printed on a window, or made conformal to the body of a vehicle.

The advantages of the Fresnel zone plate antenna are numerous. It is normally cheap to manufacture and install, easy to transport and package and can achieve high gain. Owing to its flat nature, the wind loading force of a Fresnel zone plate can be as little as 1/8 of that of conventional solid or wire-meshed reflectors of similar size. When used at millimetre wave frequencies, a Fresnel zone antenna can be an integrated with the millimetre-wave monolithic integrated circuit (MMIC) and thus becomes even more competitive than a printed antenna array.

The simplest Fresnel zone plate antenna is the circular half-wave zone plate invented in the nineteenth century. The basic idea is to divide a plane aperture into circular zones with respect to a chosen focal point on the basis that all radiation from each zone arrives at the focal point in phase within ±π/2 range. If the radiation from alternate zones is suppressed or shifted in phase by π, an approximate focus is obtained and a feed can be placed there to collect the received energy effectively. Despite its simplicity, the half-wave zone plate remained mainly as an optical device for a long time, primarily because its efficiency is too low (less than 20%) and the sidelobe level of its radiation pattern is too high to compete with conventional reflector antennas.

Compared with conventional reflector and lens antennas, reported research on microwave and millimetre-wave Fresnel zone antennas appears to be limited. In 1948, Maddaus published the design and experimental work on stepped half-wave lens antennas operating at 23 GHz and sidelobe levels of around −17 dB were achieved. In 1961, Buskirk and Hendrix reported an experiment on simple circular phase reversal zone plate reflector antennas for radio frequency operation. Unfortunately, the sidelobe they achieved was as high as −7 dB. In 1987, Black and Wiltse published their theoretical and experimental work on the stepped quarter-wave zone plate at 35 GHz. A sidelobe level of about −17 dB was achieved. A year later a phase reversal zone plate reflector operating at 94 GHz was reported by Huder and Menzel, and 25% efficiency and −19 dB sidelobe level were obtained. An experiment on a similar antenna at 11.8 GHz was reported by NASA researchers in 1989. 5% 3 dB bandwidth and −16 dB sidelobe level were measured.

Until the 1980s, the Fresnel zone plate antenna was regarded as a poor candidate for microwave applications. Following the development of DBS services in the eighties, however, antenna engineers began to consider the use of Fresnel zone plates as candidate antennas for DBS reception, where antenna cost is an important factor. This, to some extent, provided a commercial push to the research on Fresnel zone antennas.

== Offset Fresnel antenna ==
The offset Fresnel zone plate was first reported in [year needed]. In contrast to the symmetrical Fresnel zone plate which consists of a set of circular zones, the offset Fresnel zone plate consists of a set of elliptical zones defined by
$$\frac{x^2}{b^2} + \frac{(y-c)^2}{a^2} = 1$$

where a, b, and c are determined by the offset angle and focal length and the zone index. This feature introduces some new problems to the analysis of offset Fresnel zone plate antennas. The formulae and algorithms for predicting the radiation pattern of an offset Fresnel lens antenna are presented in, where some experimental results are also reported. Although a simple Fresnel lens antenna has low efficiency, it serves as a very attractive indoor candidate when a large window or an electrically transparent wall is available. In the application of direct broadcasting services (DBS), for example, an offset Fresnel lens can be produced by simply painting a zonal pattern on a window glass or a blind with conducting material. The satellite signal passing through the transparent zones is then collected by using an indoor feed.

== Phase correcting antenna ==
To increase the efficiency of Fresnel zone plate antennas, one can divide each Fresnel zone into several sub-zones, such as quarter-wave sub-zones, and provide an appropriate phase shift in each of them, thus resulting in a sub-zone phase correcting zone plate. The problem with dielectric based zone plate lens antenna is that whilst a dielectric is providing a phase shift to the transmitted wave, it inevitably reflects some of the energy back, so the efficiency of such a lens is limited. However, the low efficiency problem for a zone plate reflector is less severe, as total reflection can be achieved by using a conducting reflector behind the zone plate. Based on the focal field analysis, it is demonstrated that high efficiency zone plate reflectors can be obtained by employing the multilayer phase correcting technique, which is to use a number of dielectric slabs of low permittivity and print different metallic zonal patterns on the different interfaces. The design and experiments of circular and offset multilayer phase correcting zone plate reflectors were presented in.

A problem with the multilayer zone plate reflector is the complexity introduced, which might offset the advantage of using Fresnel zone plate antennas. One solution is to print an inhomogeneous array of conducting elements on a grounded dielectric plate, thus leading to the so-called single-layer printed flat reflector. This configuration bears much in common with the printed array antenna but it requires the use of a feed antenna instead of a corporate feed network. In contrast to the normal array antenna, the array elements are different and are arranged in a pseudo-periodic manner. The theory and design method of single layer printed flat reflectors incorporating conducting rings and experimental results on such an antenna operating in the X-band were given in. Naturally, this leads to a more general antenna concept, the phase correcting reflective array.

== Reflectarray antenna ==
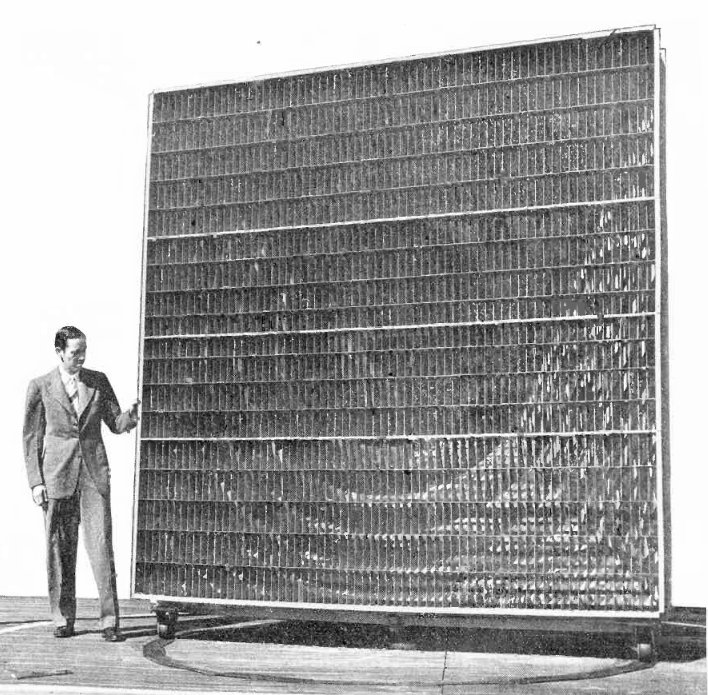
Prototype metallic lens antenna for 6 GHz microwaves, developed at Bell Labs in 1946 by Winston E. Kock, shown standing next to it. It consists of a 3.0 m × 3.0 m (10 ft × 10 ft) vertical lattice of parallel metal strips in the form of a Fresnel lens.

A phase correcting reflective array consists of an array of phase shifting elements illuminated by a feed placed at the focal point. The word "reflective" refers to the fact that each phase shifting element reflects back the energy in the incident wave with an appropriate phase shift. The phase shifting elements can be passive or active. Each phase shifting element can be designed to either produce a phase shift which is equal to that required at the element centre, or provide some quantised phase shifting values. Although the former does not seem to be commercially attractive, the latter proved to be practical antenna configuration. One potential advantage is that such an array can be reconfigured by changing the positions of the elements to produce different radiation patterns. A systematic theory of the phase efficiency of passive phase correcting array antennas and experimental results on an X-band prototype were reported in [year needed]. In recent years, it became common to call this type of antennas "reflectarrays".

== Reference phase modulation ==
It has been shown that the phase of the main lobe of a zone plate follows its reference phase, a constant path length or phase added to the formula for the zones, but that the phase of the side lobes is much less sensitive.
$$r_n = \sqrt{(n+\alpha) \lambda f + \frac{(n+\alpha)^2\lambda^2}{4}}$$
So, when it is possible to modulate the signal by changing the material properties dynamically, the modulation of the side lobes is much less than that of the main lobe and so they disappear on demodulation, leaving a cleaner and more private signal.

== Beamsteering Fresnel antennas ==
Beamsteering can be applied by amplitude/phase control or amplitude-only control of the elements of an antenna array positioned in the focal point of the lens as antenna feed. With amplitude-only control, no bandwidth-limiting phase shifters are needed, saving complexity and alleviating bandwidth constraints at the cost of limited beamsteering capability.

== Three-dimensional Fresnel antennas ==
In order to increase the focusing, resolving and scanning properties and to create different shaped radiation patterns the Fresnel zone plate and antenna can be assembled conformable to a curvilinear natural or man-made formation and used as a diffractive antenna-radome.
