= Photon sieve =

Optical device

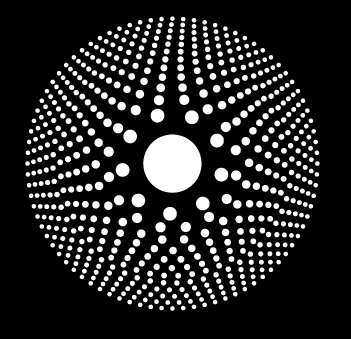
Photon sieve

A photon sieve is a device for focusing light using diffraction and interference. It consists of a flat sheet of material full of pinholes that are arranged in a pattern which is similar to the rings in a Fresnel zone plate, but with the ability to bring light to much sharper focus. The sieve concept, first developed in 2001, is versatile because the characteristics of the focusing behaviour can be altered to suit the application by manufacturing a sieve containing holes of several different sizes and different arrangement of the pattern of holes.

Photon sieves have applications to photolithography and are an alternative to lenses or mirrors in telescopes and terahertz lenses and antennas.

When the size of sieves is smaller than one wavelength of operating light, the traditional method mentioned above to describe the diffraction patterns is not valid. The vectorial theory must be used to approximate the diffraction of light from nanosieves. In this theory, the combination of coupled-mode theory and multipole expansion method is used to give an analytical model, which can facilitate the demonstration of traditional devices such as lenses and holograms.

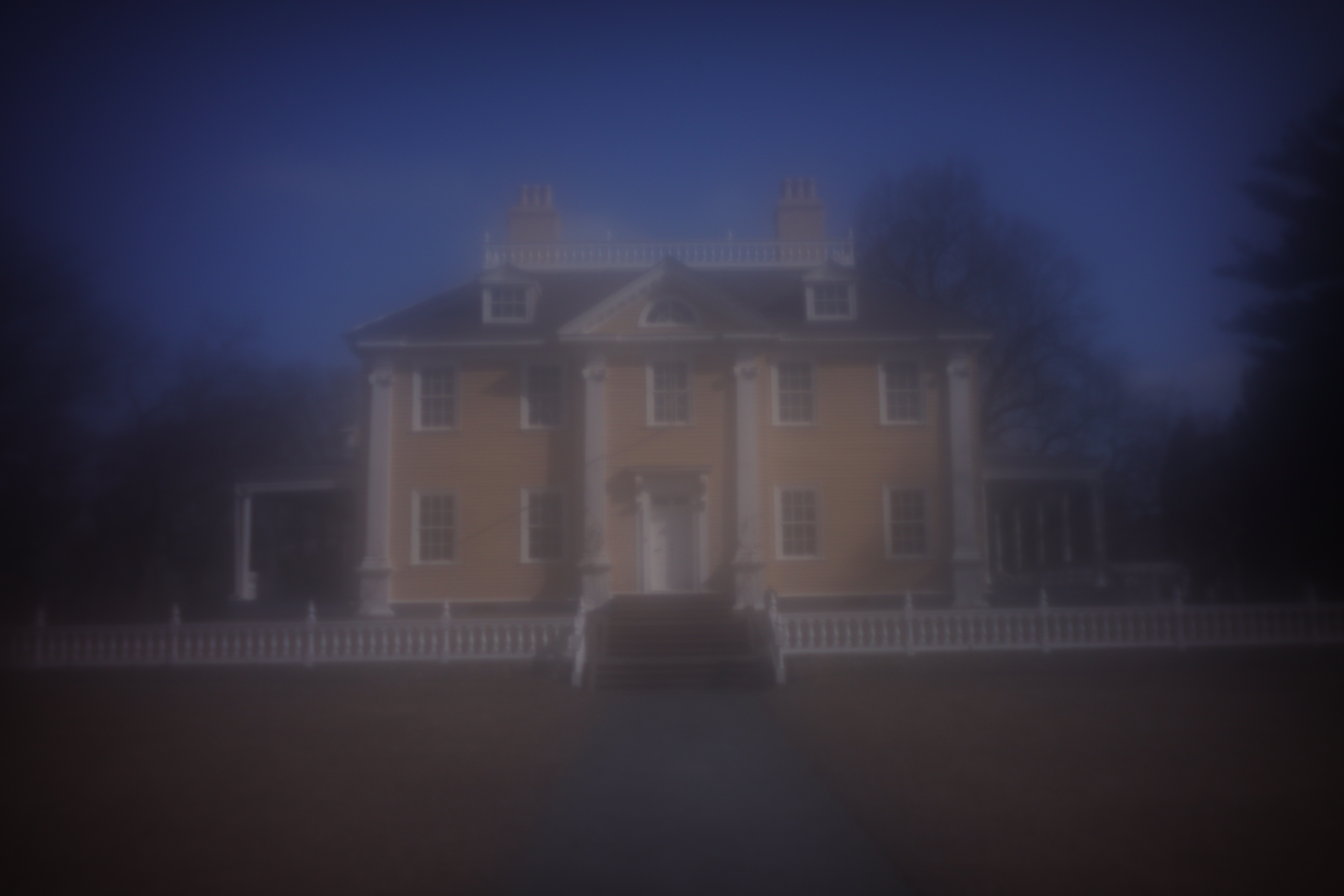
A photon sieve photograph showing chromatic aberration.

== Alternative explanation ==
When following a radial path on a Fresnel zone plate, the transmission varies from 0 to 1 to 0 etc. The transition from 0 to 1 and back again is immediate—it is a square wave. A square wave can be constructed from an infinite series of sinusoidal curves. Within a Fresnel zone plate, each of these sinusoidally curved transmission patterns creates a different focus, so a standard Fresnel zone plate creates a rather messy primary focus as shown in figure 4 of reference 1. If the transmission function could be made to vary radially as a single sinusoid, then there would be just one focus. This and the following are explained in detail in reference 8 especially chapter 2 summarised in equation 2.95 and Table 1 therein. However a perfectly sinusoidal transmission pattern may be difficult to manufacture and can be closely approximated by having the average transmission at a given radius (i.e. averaging all the way around a circle at that radius) from the centre vary sinusoidally. This can be achieved by punching holes of appropriate size at calculated locations as in a photon sieve. Holes are easy to manufacture and allow one to use a binary pattern that varies radially and around each circle to make on average a sinusoidal variation, thereby eliminating other foci.
