= Zone plate =

Device used to focus light using diffraction

Binary zone plate: The areas of each ring, both light and dark, are equal.

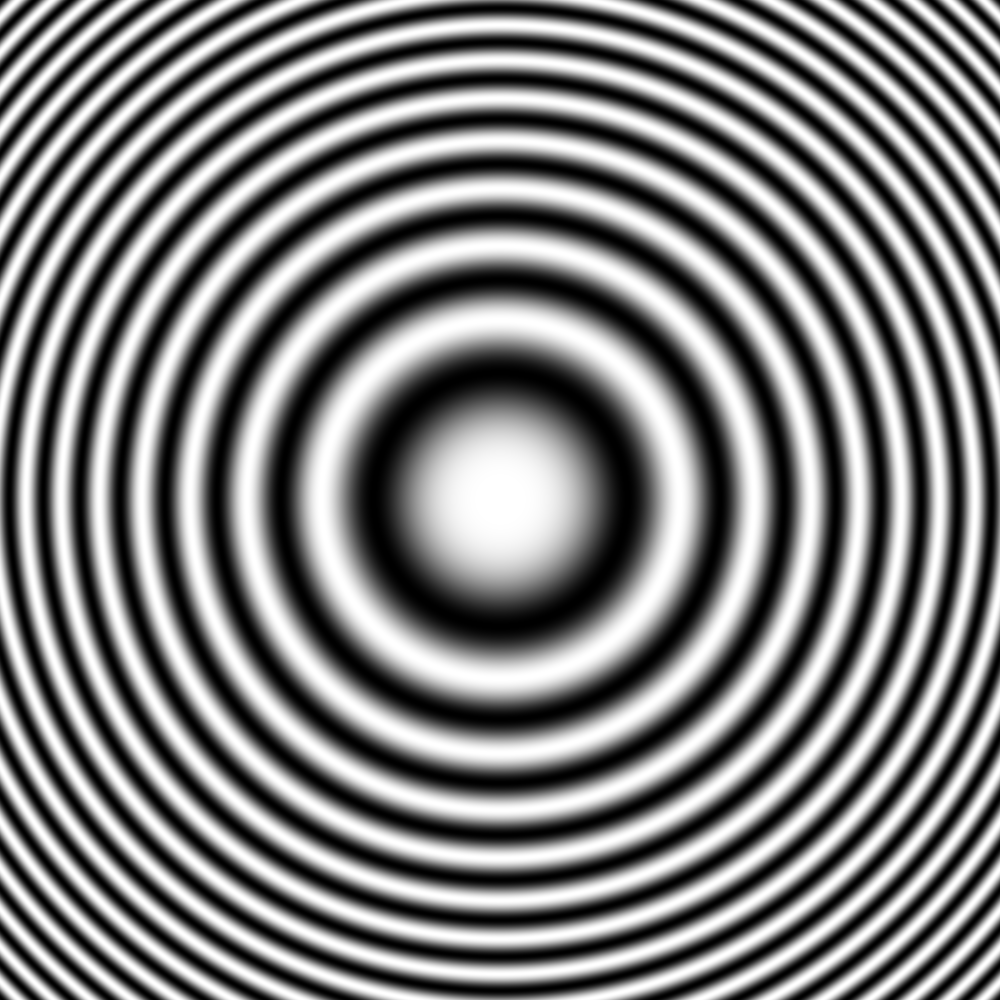
Sinusoidal zone plate: This type has a single focal point.

A zone plate is a device used to focus light or other things exhibiting wave character. Unlike lenses or curved mirrors, zone plates use diffraction instead of refraction or reflection. Based on analysis by French physicist Augustin-Jean Fresnel, they are sometimes called Fresnel zone plates in his honor. The zone plate's focusing ability is an extension of the Arago spot phenomenon caused by diffraction from an opaque disc.

A zone plate consists of a set of concentric rings, known as Fresnel zones, which alternate between being opaque and transparent. Light hitting the zone plate will diffract around the opaque zones. The zones can be spaced so that the diffracted light constructively interferes at the desired focus, creating an image there.

== Design and manufacture ==
To get constructive interference at the focus, the zones should switch from opaque to transparent at radii where
$$r_n = \sqrt{n\lambda f + \frac{1}{4}n^2 \lambda^2}$$

where n is an integer, λ is the wavelength of the light the zone plate is meant to focus, and f is the distance from the center of the zone plate to the primary focus. When the zone plate is small compared to the focal length, this can be approximated as
$$r_n \simeq \sqrt{n\lambda f}$$

For plates with many zones, you can calculate the distance to the focus if you only know the radius of the outermost zone, r_{N}, and its width, Δr_{N}:
$$f = \frac{2r_N \Delta r_N}{\lambda}$$

In the long focal length limit, the area of each zone is equal, because the width of the zones must decrease farther from the center. The maximum possible resolution of a zone plate depends on the smallest zone width,
$$\frac{\Delta l}{\Delta r_N} \approx 1.22$$

Because of this, the smallest size object you can image, Δl, is limited by how small you can reliably make your zones.

Zone plates are frequently manufactured using lithography. As lithography technology improves and the size of features that can be manufactured decreases, the possible resolution of zone plates manufactured with this technique can improve.

Unlike a standard lens, a binary zone plate produces intensity maxima along the axis of the plate at odd fractions of the primary focus(f/3, f/5, f/7, etc.). Although these contain less energy (counts of the spot) than the principal focus (because it is wider), they have the same maximum intensity (counts/m^{2}). At even fractions of the primary focus (f/2, f/4, f/6, etc.), the intensity on-axis is zero.

=== Continuous zone plates ===
If the zone plate is constructed so that the opacity varies in a gradual, sinusoidal manner, the resulting diffraction causes only a single focal point to be formed. This type of zone plate pattern is the equivalent of a transmission hologram of a converging lens.

For a smooth zone plate, the opacity (or transparency) at a point can be given by:
$$\frac{1 \pm \cos\left(kr^2\right)}{2}\,$$

where r is the distance from the plate center, and k determines the plate's scale.

Binary zone plates use almost the same formula, however they depend only on the sign:
$$\frac{1 \pm \sgn\left(\cos\left(kr^2\right)\right)}{2}\,$$

=== Free parameter ===
It does not matter to the constructive interference what the absolute phase is, but only that it is the same from each ring. So an arbitrary length can be added to all the paths
$$r_n = \sqrt{(n + \alpha)\lambda f + \frac{1}{4}(n + \alpha)^2 \lambda^2}$$

This reference phase can be chosen to optimize secondary properties such as side lobes.

== Applications ==
=== Physics ===
There are many wavelengths of light outside of the visible area of the electromagnetic spectrum where traditional lens materials like glass are not transparent, and so lenses are more difficult to manufacture. Likewise, there are many wavelengths for which there are no materials with a refractive index significantly differing from one. X-rays, for example, are only weakly refracted by glass or other materials, and so require a different technique for focusing. Zone plates eliminate the need for finding transparent, refractive, easy-to-manufacture materials for every region of the spectrum. The same zone plate will focus light of many wavelengths to different foci, which means they can also be used to filter out unwanted wavelengths while focusing the light of interest.

Other waves such as sound waves and, due to quantum mechanics, matter waves can be focused in the same way. Wave plates have been used to focus beams of neutrons and helium atoms.

=== Photography ===
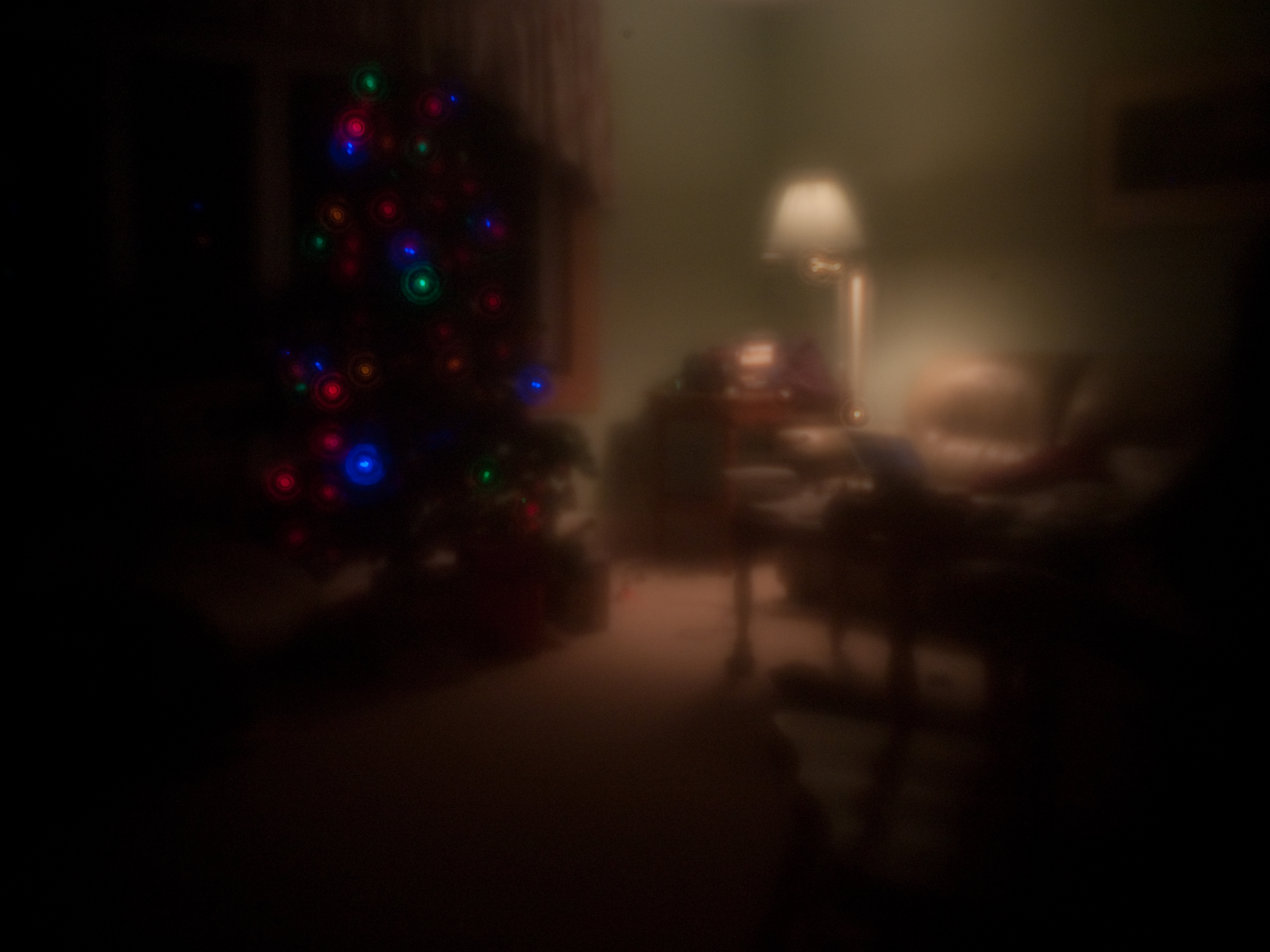
Example of an image taken with zone plate optics.

Zone plates are also used in photography in place of a lens or pinhole for a glowing, soft-focus image. One advantage over pinholes (aside from the unique, fuzzy look achieved with zone plates) is that the transparent area is larger than that of a comparable pinhole. The result is that the effective f-number of a zone plate is lower than for the corresponding pinhole and the exposure time can be decreased. Common f-numbers for a pinhole camera range from f/150 to f/200 or higher, whereas zone plates are frequently f/40 and lower. This makes hand held shots feasible at the higher ISO settings available with newer DSLR cameras.

=== Gunsights ===
Zone plates have been proposed as a cheap alternative to more expensive optical sights or targeting lasers.

=== Lenses ===
Zone plates may be used as imaging lenses with a single focus as long as the type of grating used is sinusoidal in nature. A specifically designed Fresnel zone plate with blazed phase structures is sometimes called a kinoform.

=== Reflection ===
A zone plate used as a reflector will allow radio waves to be focused as if by a parabolic reflector. This allows the reflector to be flat, and so easier to make. It also allows an appropriately patterned Fresnel reflector to be mounted flush to the side of a building, avoiding the wind loading that a paraboloid would be subject to.

=== Software testing ===
A bitmap representation of a zone plate image may be used for testing various image processing algorithms, such as:

- Image interpolation and image resampling;
- Image filtering.

An open-source zone-plate image generator is available.

== See also ==
- Arago spot
- Diffraction grating
- Fresnel imager
- Fresnel lens
- Fresnel number
- Fresnel zone antenna
- Photon sieve
