= Lagrange's identity (disambiguation) =

Lagrange's identity may refer to:

- Lagrange's identity, an algebraic identity
- Lagrange's identity (boundary value problem), an identity in calculus
- Lagrange's trigonometric identities, two trigonometric identities
- Lagrange's four-square theorem, a theorem from number theory
- Lagrange polynomial for theorems relating to numerical interpolation
- Euler–Lagrange equation of variational mechanics
