= Green's identities =

Vector calculus formulas relating the bulk with the boundary of a region

In mathematics, Green's identities are a set of three identities in vector calculus relating the bulk with the boundary of a region on which differential operators act. They are named after the mathematician George Green, who discovered Green's theorem.

== Green's first identity ==
This identity is derived from the divergence theorem applied to the vector field $\mathbf{F} = \psi \nabla \varphi$ while using an extension of the product rule that $\nabla \cdot \left ( \psi \mathbf{X} \right ) = \nabla \psi \cdot \mathbf{X} + \psi \nabla \cdot \mathbf{X}$ (Note: $\nabla$ - Del operator - is specified by a coordinate system in use. In other words, it is in terms of independent variables (specified by the coordinate system) of $\psi$ and $\varphi$.), where $\psi$ and $\varphi$ are scalar functions and $\mathbf{X}$ is a vector field.

Let $\psi$ and $\varphi$ be scalar functions defined on some region U ⊂ R^{d}, and suppose that $\psi$ is once continuously differentiable and $\varphi$ is twice continuously differentiable. Using the product rule above with letting X = ∇φ, integration of $\nabla \cdot \mathbf{F} = \nabla \cdot \left( \psi \nabla \varphi \right)$ over U results in the Green's first identity:
$$\begin{array}{lcl}
\int_U \left( \psi \, \Delta \varphi + \nabla \psi \cdot \nabla \varphi \right)\, dV & = & \oint_{\partial U} \psi \left( \nabla \varphi \cdot \mathbf{n} \right)\, dS \\
& = & \oint_{\partial U}\psi\,\nabla\varphi\cdot d\mathbf{S}
\end{array}$$
where $\Delta$ (or $\nabla ^2$) in $\Delta f = \nabla^2 f = \nabla \cdot \nabla f$ is the Laplace operator, ∂U is the boundary of region U, n is the outward pointing unit normal to the surface element dS, and dS = ndS is the oriented surface element.

This theorem is a special case of the divergence theorem, and is essentially the higher dimensional equivalent of integration by parts with ψ and the gradient of φ replacing u and v.

Note that Green's first identity above is a special case of the more general identity derived from the divergence theorem by substituting $\mathbf{F} = \psi \mathbf{\Gamma}$ where $\psi$ is a scalar function and $\mathbf{\Gamma}$ is a vector field (in the above, $\mathbf{\Gamma}$ is specified as $\nabla \varphi$),
$$\int_U \left( \psi \, \nabla \cdot \mathbf{\Gamma} + \mathbf{\Gamma} \cdot \nabla \psi\right)\, dV  = \oint_{\partial U} \psi \left( \mathbf{\Gamma} \cdot \mathbf{n} \right)\, dS=\oint_{\partial U}\psi\mathbf{\Gamma}\cdot d\mathbf{S} ~.$$

== Green's second identity ==
If both $\varphi$ and $\psi$ are twice continuously differentiable scalar functions on U ⊂ R^{3}, and ε is a once continuously differentiable scalar function, then one may choose $\mathbf{F} = \psi \varepsilon \nabla \varphi - \varphi \varepsilon \nabla \psi$ (Note: $\nabla$ is for independent variables of $\psi$, $\varepsilon$, and $\varphi$.) in the divergence theorem where

$$\begin{array}{lcl}
\nabla \cdot \mathbf{F} & = & \nabla \cdot \left (\psi \varepsilon \nabla \varphi - \varphi \varepsilon \nabla \psi \right ) \\
& = & \nabla \left ( \psi\varepsilon  \right ) \cdot \nabla \varphi + \psi \varepsilon \nabla^2 \varphi
- \nabla \left ( \varphi \varepsilon  \right ) \cdot \nabla \psi - \varphi \varepsilon \nabla^2 \psi \\
& = & \left ( \varepsilon \nabla \psi + \psi \nabla \varepsilon \right ) \cdot \nabla \varphi + \psi \varepsilon
\nabla^2 \varphi - \left ( \varepsilon \nabla \varphi + \varphi \nabla \varepsilon \right) \cdot \nabla \psi
- \varphi \varepsilon \nabla^2 \psi \\
& = & \psi \nabla \varepsilon \cdot \nabla \varphi + \psi \varepsilon \nabla^2 \varphi
- \varphi \nabla \varepsilon \cdot \nabla \psi - \varphi \varepsilon \nabla^2 \psi \\
& = & \psi \nabla \cdot \left( \varepsilon \nabla \varphi \right) - \varphi \nabla \cdot \left( \varepsilon \nabla \psi \right)
\end{array}$$

is obtained with help from vector calculus identities.

As a result,
$$\begin{array}{lcl}
\int_U \left[ \psi \, \nabla \cdot \left( \varepsilon \, \nabla \varphi \right) - \varphi \, \nabla \cdot \left( \varepsilon \, \nabla \psi \right) \right]\, dV & = & \oint_{\partial U} \varepsilon \left( \psi {\partial \varphi \over \partial \mathbf{n}} - \varphi {\partial \psi \over \partial \mathbf{n}}\right)\, dS\\
& = & \oint_{\partial U} \varepsilon \left( \psi \nabla \varphi - \varphi \nabla \psi\right)\cdot d\mathbf{S}.
\end{array}$$

Here, ∂φ/∂n is the directional derivative of φ in the direction of the outward pointing surface unit normal vector n of an surface element dS ($d \mathbf{S} = dS \mathbf{n}$),
$${\partial \varphi \over \partial \mathbf{n}} = \nabla \varphi \cdot \mathbf{n} = \nabla_\mathbf{n}\varphi.$$
For the special case of ε = 1 all across U ⊂ R^{3}, then the Green's second identity is obtained:
$$\begin{array}{lcl}
\int_U \left( \psi \, \nabla^2 \varphi - \varphi \, \nabla^2 \psi\right)\, dV & = & \oint_{\partial U} \left( \psi {\partial \varphi \over \partial \mathbf{n}} - \varphi {\partial \psi \over \partial \mathbf{n}}\right)\, dS\\
& = & \oint_{\partial U} \left( \psi \nabla \varphi - \varphi \nabla \psi\right)\cdot d\mathbf{S},
\end{array}$$

or by using $\Delta=\nabla^2$ (the Laplacian operator),

$$\int_U \left( \psi \, \Delta \varphi - \varphi \, \Delta \psi\right)\, dV = \oint_{\partial U} \left( \psi \nabla \varphi - \varphi \nabla \psi\right)\cdot d\mathbf{S}$$

In particular, this demonstrates that the Laplacian is a self-adjoint operator in the L^{2} inner product for functions vanishing on the boundary so that the right-hand side of the above identity is zero.

== Green's third identity ==
Green's third identity derives from the second identity by choosing φ = G, where Green's function G is taken to be a fundamental solution of the Laplace operator, ∆. This means that:
$$\Delta G(\mathbf{x},\boldsymbol{\eta}) = \delta(\mathbf{x} - \boldsymbol{\eta}) ~.$$

For example, in R^{3}, a solution has the form
$$G(\mathbf{x},\boldsymbol{\eta})= \frac{-1}{4 \pi \|\mathbf{x} - \boldsymbol{\eta} \|} ~.$$

Green's third identity states that if ψ is a function that is twice continuously differentiable on U, then

$$\int_U \left[ \delta(\mathbf{y} - \boldsymbol{\eta}) \psi(\boldsymbol{\eta})  -  G(\mathbf{y},\boldsymbol{\eta}) \, \Delta \psi(\mathbf{y}) \right] \, dV_\mathbf{y} =  \oint_{\partial U} \left[\psi(\mathbf{y}) {\partial G(\mathbf{y},\boldsymbol{\eta}) \over \partial \mathbf{n}} - G(\mathbf{y},\boldsymbol{\eta}) {\partial \psi(\mathbf{y})\over \partial \mathbf{n}} \right]\, dS_\mathbf{y}.$$

Note that the integral over $\delta(\mathbf{y} - \boldsymbol{\eta})\psi(\boldsymbol{\eta})$ reproduces $\psi$ when $\boldsymbol{\eta}\in U$ and gives 0 otherwise.

A simplification arises if ψ is itself a harmonic function, i.e. a solution to the Laplace equation in $U$. Then $\Delta\psi = 0$ and the identity simplifies to

$$\oint_{\partial U} \left[\psi(\mathbf{y}) \frac{\partial G(\mathbf{y},\boldsymbol{\eta})}{\partial \mathbf{n}} - G(\mathbf{y},\boldsymbol{\eta}) \frac{\partial \psi(\mathbf{y}) }{\partial \mathbf{n}} \right]\, dS_\mathbf{y}
= \begin{cases}
\psi(\boldsymbol{\eta}) \qquad & \boldsymbol{\eta}\in U\\
0 & \boldsymbol{\eta}\notin U
\end{cases}.$$

The second term in the integral above can be eliminated if G is chosen to be Green's function that vanishes on the boundary of U (Dirichlet boundary condition),
$$\oint_{\partial U} \psi(\mathbf{y}) \frac{\partial G(\mathbf{y},\boldsymbol{\eta})}{\partial \mathbf{n}} \, dS_\mathbf{y}
= \begin{cases}
\psi(\boldsymbol{\eta}) \qquad & \boldsymbol{\eta}\in U\\
0 & \boldsymbol{\eta}\notin U
\end{cases}.$$

This form is used to construct solutions to Dirichlet boundary condition problems. Solutions for Neumann boundary condition problems may also be simplified, though the Divergence theorem applied to the differential equation defining Green's functions shows that the Green's function cannot integrate to zero on the boundary, and hence cannot vanish on the boundary. See Green's functions for the Laplacian or for a detailed argument, with an alternative.

For the Neumann boundary condition, an appropriate choice of Green's function can be made to simplify the integral. First note

$$\int_U \Delta G(\mathbf{y},\boldsymbol{\eta}) dV_\mathbf{y}  = 1 = \oint_{\partial U}  \frac{\partial G(\mathbf{y},\boldsymbol{\eta})}{\partial \mathbf{n}} dS_\mathbf{y} ~ \qquad\qquad \boldsymbol{\eta}\in U.$$

and so $\frac{\partial G(\mathbf{y},\boldsymbol{\eta})}{\partial \mathbf{n}}$ cannot vanish on surface $S$. A convenient choice is $\frac{\partial G(\mathbf{y},\boldsymbol{\eta})}{\partial \mathbf{n}} = \frac{1}{\mathcal{A}}$, where $\mathcal{A}$ is the area of the surface $S$. The integral can be simplified to

$$\psi(\boldsymbol{\eta})= \langle\psi\rangle_S- \oint_{\partial U} G(\mathbf{y},\boldsymbol{\eta}) \frac{\partial \psi(\mathbf{y})}{\partial \mathbf{n}}  \, dS_\mathbf{y}.$$

where $\langle\psi\rangle_S = \frac{1}{\mathcal{A}} \oint_{\partial U} \psi(\mathbf{y}) dS_\mathbf{y}$ is the average value of $\psi$ on surface $S$.

Furthermore, if $\psi$ is a solution to the Laplace's equation, divergence theorem implies it must satisfy $\oint_{\partial U} \frac{\partial \psi(\mathbf{y})}{\partial \mathbf{n}} dS_\mathbf{y} = \int_U \Delta \psi(\mathbf{y})dV_\mathbf{y} = 0$. This is a necessary condition for the Neumann boundary problem to have a solution.

It can be further verified that the above identity also applies when ψ is a solution to the Helmholtz equation or wave equation and G is the appropriate Green's function. In such a context, this identity is the mathematical expression of the Huygens principle, and leads to Kirchhoff's diffraction formula and other approximations.

== On manifolds ==
Green's identities hold on a Riemannian manifold. In this setting, the first two are
$$\begin{align}
\int_M u \,\Delta v\, dV + \int_M \langle\nabla u, \nabla v\rangle\, dV &= \int_{\partial M} u N v \, d\widetilde{V} \\
\int_M \left (u \, \Delta v - v \, \Delta u \right )\, dV &= \int_{\partial M}(u N v - v N u) \, d \widetilde{V}
\end{align}$$
where u and v are smooth real-valued functions on M, dV is the volume form compatible with the metric, $d\widetilde{V}$ is the induced volume form on the boundary of M, N is the outward oriented unit vector field normal to the boundary, and Δu = div(grad u) is the Laplacian.

== Green's vector identities ==
=== First vector identity ===
Using the vector Laplacian identity and the divergence identity, expand $\mathbf{P}\cdot \Delta \mathbf{Q}$

$$\mathbf{P}\cdot \Delta \mathbf{Q} = \nabla \cdot (\mathbf{P}\times \nabla \times \mathbf{Q}) - (\nabla \times \mathbf{P})\cdot (\nabla \times \mathbf{Q}) +\mathbf{P}\cdot [\nabla(\nabla \cdot \mathbf{Q})]$$

The last term can be simplified by expanding components
$$\begin{align}
\mathbf{P}\cdot [\nabla(\nabla \cdot \mathbf{Q})] &= P^i[\nabla_i(\nabla_j Q^j)]\\
&= \nabla_i[P^i(\nabla_j Q^j)]-(\nabla_i P^i)(\nabla_j Q^j)\\
&= \nabla\cdot[\mathbf{P}(\nabla \cdot \mathbf{Q})] - (\nabla \cdot \mathbf{P})(\nabla \cdot \mathbf{Q})
\end{align}$$

The identity can be rewritten as
$$\mathbf{P}\cdot \Delta \mathbf{Q} = \nabla \cdot (\mathbf{P}\times \nabla \times \mathbf{Q}) - (\nabla \times \mathbf{P})\cdot (\nabla \times \mathbf{Q}) + \nabla\cdot[\mathbf{P}(\nabla \cdot \mathbf{Q})] - (\nabla \cdot \mathbf{P})(\nabla \cdot \mathbf{Q})$$

In integral form, this is
$$\oint_{\partial U} \mathbf{n} \cdot \left[\mathbf{P}\times \nabla \times \mathbf{Q} + \mathbf{P}(\nabla \cdot \mathbf{Q})  \right]  dS
= \int_U \left[ \mathbf{P}\cdot \Delta \mathbf{Q} + (\nabla \times \mathbf{P}) \cdot (\nabla \times \mathbf{Q}) + (\nabla \cdot \mathbf{P})(\nabla \cdot \mathbf{Q}) \right]  dV$$

=== Second vector identity ===
Green's second identity establishes a relationship between second and (the divergence of) first order derivatives of two scalar functions. In differential form
$$p_m \, \Delta q_m-q_m \, \Delta p_m = \nabla\cdot\left(p_m\nabla q_m-q_m \, \nabla p_m\right),$$
where p_{m} and q_{m} are two arbitrary twice continuously differentiable scalar fields. This identity is of great importance in physics because continuity equations can thus be established for scalar fields such as mass or energy.

In vector diffraction theory, two versions of Green's second identity are introduced.

One variant invokes the divergence of a cross product and states a relationship in terms of the curl-curl of the field
$$\mathbf{P}\cdot\left(\nabla\times\nabla\times\mathbf{Q}\right)-\mathbf{Q}\cdot\left(\nabla\times\nabla\times \mathbf{P}\right) = \nabla\cdot\left(\mathbf{Q}\times\left(\nabla\times\mathbf{P}\right)-\mathbf{P}\times\left(\nabla\times\mathbf{Q}\right)\right).$$

This equation can be written in terms of the Laplacians,

$$\mathbf{P}\cdot\Delta \mathbf{Q}-\mathbf{Q}\cdot\Delta \mathbf{P} + \mathbf{Q} \cdot \left[\nabla\left(\nabla\cdot\mathbf{P}\right)\right]-\mathbf{P} \cdot \left[ \nabla \left(\nabla \cdot \mathbf{Q}\right)\right] = \nabla \cdot \left( \mathbf{P}\times \left(\nabla\times\mathbf{Q}\right) - \mathbf{Q}\times\left(\nabla\times\mathbf{P}\right)\right).$$

However, the terms
$$\mathbf{Q}\cdot\left[\nabla\left(\nabla\cdot\mathbf{P}\right)\right]-\mathbf{P} \cdot \left[\nabla\left(\nabla\cdot\mathbf{Q}\right)\right],$$
could not be readily written in terms of a divergence.

The other approach introduces bi-vectors, this formulation requires a dyadic Green function. The derivation presented here avoids these problems.

Consider that the scalar fields in Green's second identity are the Cartesian components of vector fields, i.e.,
$$\mathbf{P}=\sum_m p_{m}\hat{\mathbf{e}}_m, \qquad \mathbf{Q}=\sum_m q_m \hat{\mathbf{e}}_m.$$

Summing up the equation for each component, we obtain
$$\sum_m \left[p_m\Delta q_m - q_m\Delta p_m\right]=\sum_m \nabla \cdot \left( p_m \nabla q_m-q_m\nabla p_m \right).$$

The LHS according to the definition of the dot product may be written in vector form as
$$\sum_m \left[p_m \, \Delta q_m-q_m \, \Delta p_m\right] = \mathbf{P} \cdot \Delta\mathbf{Q}-\mathbf{Q}\cdot\Delta\mathbf{P}.$$

The RHS is a bit more awkward to express in terms of vector operators. Due to the distributivity of the divergence operator over addition, the sum of the divergence is equal to the divergence of the sum, i.e.,
$$\sum_m \nabla\cdot\left(p_m \nabla q_m-q_m\nabla p_m\right)= \nabla \cdot \left(\sum_m p_m \nabla q_m - \sum_m q_m \nabla p_m \right).$$

Recall the vector identity for the gradient of a dot product,
$$\nabla \left(\mathbf{P} \cdot \mathbf{Q} \right) = \left( \mathbf{P} \cdot \nabla \right) \mathbf{Q} + \left( \mathbf{Q} \cdot \nabla \right) \mathbf{P} + \mathbf{P}\times \left(\nabla\times\mathbf{Q}\right)+\mathbf{Q}\times \left(\nabla\times\mathbf{P}\right),$$
which, written out in vector components is given by

$$\nabla\left(\mathbf{P}\cdot\mathbf{Q}\right)=\nabla\sum_m p_m q_m = \sum_m p_m \nabla q_m + \sum_m q_m \nabla p_m.$$

This result is similar to what we wish to evince in vector terms 'except' for the minus sign. Since the differential operators in each term act either over one vector (say $p_m$'s) or the other ($q_m$'s), the contribution to each term must be
$$\sum_m p_m \nabla q_m = \left(\mathbf{P} \cdot \nabla\right) \mathbf{Q} + \mathbf{P} \times \left(\nabla \times \mathbf{Q}\right),$$
$$\sum_m q_m \nabla p_m = \left(\mathbf{Q} \cdot \nabla\right) \mathbf{P} + \mathbf{Q} \times \left(\nabla \times \mathbf{P}\right).$$

These results can be rigorously proven to be correct through evaluation of the vector components. Therefore, the RHS can be written in vector form as

$$\sum_m p_m \nabla q_m - \sum_m q_m \nabla p_m = \left(\mathbf{P} \cdot \nabla\right) \mathbf{Q} +  \mathbf{P}\times \left(\nabla\times\mathbf{Q}\right)-\left( \mathbf{Q} \cdot \nabla\right) \mathbf{P} -  \mathbf{Q}\times \left(\nabla\times\mathbf{P}\right).$$

Putting together these two results, a result analogous to Green's theorem for scalar fields is obtained,
Theorem for vector fields:
$$\color{OliveGreen}\mathbf{P} \cdot \Delta \mathbf{Q} - \mathbf{Q} \cdot \Delta \mathbf{P} = \left[ \left(\mathbf{P} \cdot \nabla\right) \mathbf{Q} +  \mathbf{P}\times \left(\nabla\times\mathbf{Q}\right)-\left( \mathbf{Q} \cdot \nabla\right) \mathbf{P} -  \mathbf{Q}\times \left(\nabla\times\mathbf{P}\right)\right].$$

The curl of a cross product can be written as
$$\nabla\times\left(\mathbf{P}\times\mathbf{Q}\right)=\left(\mathbf{Q}\cdot\nabla\right)\mathbf{P}-\left(\mathbf{P}\cdot\nabla\right)\mathbf{Q}+\mathbf{P}\left(\nabla\cdot\mathbf{Q}\right)-\mathbf{Q}\left(\nabla\cdot\mathbf{P}\right);$$

Green's vector identity can then be rewritten as
$$\mathbf{P}\cdot\Delta \mathbf{Q}-\mathbf{Q}\cdot\Delta \mathbf{P}= \nabla \cdot \left[\mathbf{P} \left(\nabla\cdot\mathbf{Q}\right)-\mathbf{Q} \left( \nabla \cdot \mathbf{P}\right)-\nabla \times \left( \mathbf{P} \times \mathbf{Q} \right) +\mathbf{P}\times\left(\nabla\times\mathbf{Q}\right) - \mathbf{Q}\times \left(\nabla\times\mathbf{P}\right)\right].$$

Since the divergence of a curl is zero, the third term vanishes to yield Green's second vector identity:
$$\color{OliveGreen}\mathbf{P}\cdot\Delta\mathbf{Q}-\mathbf{Q} \cdot \Delta \mathbf{P} =\nabla\cdot\left[\mathbf{P}\left(\nabla\cdot\mathbf{Q}\right)-\mathbf{Q} \left( \nabla \cdot \mathbf{P} \right) + \mathbf{P}\times \left(\nabla\times\mathbf{Q}\right) - \mathbf{Q}\times\left(\nabla\times\mathbf{P}\right)\right].$$

With a similar procedure, the Laplacian of the dot product can be expressed in terms of the Laplacians of the factors
$$\Delta \left( \mathbf{P} \cdot \mathbf{Q} \right) = \mathbf{P} \cdot \Delta \mathbf{Q}-\mathbf{Q}\cdot\Delta \mathbf{P} + 2\nabla \cdot \left[ \left( \mathbf{Q} \cdot \nabla \right) \mathbf{P} + \mathbf{Q} \times \nabla \times \mathbf{P} \right].$$

As a corollary, the awkward terms can now be written in terms of a divergence by comparison with the vector Green equation,
$$\mathbf{P}\cdot \left[ \nabla \left(\nabla \cdot \mathbf{Q} \right) \right] - \mathbf{Q} \cdot \left[ \nabla \left( \nabla \cdot \mathbf{P} \right) \right] = \nabla \cdot\left[\mathbf{P}\left(\nabla\cdot\mathbf{Q}\right)-\mathbf{Q} \left( \nabla \cdot \mathbf{P} \right) \right].$$

This result can be verified by expanding the divergence of a scalar times a vector on the RHS.

=== Third vector identity ===
The third vector identity can be derived using the free space scalar Green's function. Take the scalar Green's function definition $\Delta G(\mathbf{x},\boldsymbol{\eta}) =\delta(\mathbf{x}-\boldsymbol{\eta})$, multiply by $\mathbf{P}$ and subtract $G\nabla_i \nabla^i \mathbf{P}$.

$$\nabla_i (\mathbf{P} \nabla^i G - G\nabla^i \mathbf{P}) =\mathbf{P} \delta(\mathbf{x}-\boldsymbol{\eta}) - G \Delta \mathbf{P}$$

Integrate over volume $U$ and use divergence theorem.
$$\oint_{\partial U }\bigg(\mathbf{P}(\mathbf{y}) \frac{\partial G(\mathbf{y},\boldsymbol{\eta})}{\partial \mathbf{n}} - G(\mathbf{y},\boldsymbol{\eta})\frac{\partial \mathbf{P}(\mathbf{y})}{\partial \mathbf{n}}\bigg) dS_y +\int_U G(\mathbf{y},\boldsymbol{\eta}) \Delta \mathbf{P}(\mathbf{y}) dV_y =
\left\{\begin{matrix}
\mathbf{P}(\boldsymbol{\eta}) & \text{for } ~\boldsymbol{\eta}\in U  \\
0 &  \text{for } ~\boldsymbol{\eta}\not\in U \\
\end{matrix}\right.$$

== See also ==
- Green's function
- Kirchhoff integral theorem
- Lagrange's identity (boundary value problem)
