= Kirchhoff integral theorem =

Method to solve scalar wave equation

The Kirchhoff integral theorem (sometimes referred to as the Fresnel–Kirchhoff integral theorem) is a surface integral to obtain the value of the solution of the homogeneous monochromatic scalar wave equation at an arbitrary point P in terms of the values of the solution and the solution's first-order derivative at all points on an arbitrary closed surface (on which the integration is performed) that encloses P. It is derived by using Green's second identity and the homogeneous scalar wave equation that makes the volume integration in Green's second identity zero.

== Integral ==
=== Monochromatic wave ===
The integral has the following form for a monochromatic wave:

$$U(\mathbf{r}) = \frac{1}{4\pi} \int_S \left[ U \frac{\partial}{\partial\hat{\mathbf{n}}} \left( \frac{e^{iks}}{s} \right) - \frac{e^{iks}}{s} \frac{\partial U}{\partial\hat{\mathbf{n}}} \right] dS,$$

where the integration is performed over an arbitrary closed surface S enclosing the observation point $\mathbf{r}$, $k$ in $e^{iks}$ is the wavenumber, $s$ in $\frac{e^{iks}}{s}$ is the distance from an (infinitesimally small) integral surface element to the point $\mathbf{r}$, $U$ is the spatial part of the solution of the homogeneous scalar wave equation (i.e., $V(\mathbf{r},t) = U(\mathbf{r}) e^{-i\omega t}$ as the homogeneous scalar wave equation solution), $\hat{\mathbf{n}}$ is the unit vector inward from and normal to the integral surface element, i.e., the inward surface normal unit vector, and $\frac{\partial}{\partial\hat{\mathbf{n}}}$ denotes differentiation along the surface normal (i.e., a normal derivative) i.e., $\frac{\partial f}{\partial\hat{\mathbf{n}}}=\nabla f \cdot \hat{\mathbf{n}}$ for a scalar field $f$. (Note: The del operator $\nabla$ here is in terms of independent variables of the functions $\frac{e^{iks}}{s}$ and $U$.) Note that the surface normal is inward, i.e., it is toward the inside of the enclosed volume, in this integral; if the more usual outer-pointing normal is used, the integral will have the opposite sign.

This integral can be written in a more familiar form

$$U(\mathbf{r}) = \frac{1}{4\pi} \int_S \left( U \nabla \left( \frac{e^{iks}}{s} \right) - \frac{e^{iks}}{s} \nabla U \right) \cdot d\vec{S},$$

where $d\vec{S}=dS{\hat {\mathbf {n} }}$.

=== Non-monochromatic wave ===
A more general form can be derived for non-monochromatic waves. The complex amplitude of the wave can be represented by a Fourier integral of the form

$$V(r,t) = \frac{1}{\sqrt{2\pi}} \int U_\omega(r) e^{-i\omega t} \,d\omega,$$

where, by Fourier inversion, we have

$$U_\omega(r) = \frac{1}{\sqrt{2\pi}} \int V(r,t) e^{i\omega t} \,dt.$$

The integral theorem (above) is applied to each Fourier component $U_\omega$, and the following expression is obtained:

$$V(r,t) = \frac{1}{4\pi} \int_S \left\{[V] \frac {\partial}{\partial n} \left(\frac {1}{s}\right) - \frac {1}{cs} \frac {\partial s}{\partial n} \left[\frac{\partial V}{\partial t}\right] - \frac{1}{s} \left[\frac{\partial V}{\partial n} \right] \right\} dS,$$

where the square brackets on V terms denote retarded values, i.e. the values at time t − s/c.

Kirchhoff showed that the above equation can be approximated to a simpler form in many cases, known as Kirchhoff's diffraction formula, which is equivalent to the Huygens–Fresnel equation, except that it provides the inclination factor, which is not defined in the Huygens–Fresnel equation. The diffraction integral can be applied to a wide range of problems in optics.

=== Integral derivation ===
Here, the derivation of the Kirchhoff's integral theorem is introduced. First, the Green's second identity as the following is used.

$$\int_V \left( U_1  \nabla^2 U_2 - U_2  \nabla^2 U_1\right) dV = \oint_{\partial V} \left( U_2 {\partial U_1 \over \partial \hat{\mathbf{n}}} - U_1 {\partial U_2 \over \partial \hat{\mathbf{n}}} \right) dS,$$
where the integral surface normal unit vector $\hat{\mathbf{n}}$ here is toward the volume $V$ closed by an integral surface $\partial V$. Scalar field functions $U_1$ and $U_2$ are set to solutions of the Helmholtz equation, $\nabla^2 U + k^2U = 0$ (Note: The del operator $\nabla$ here is in terms of independent variables of the functions $U_1$ and $U_2$.) where $k = \frac{2\pi}{\lambda}$ is the wavenumber ($\lambda$ is the wavelength), that gives the spatial part of a complex-valued monochromatic (single frequency in time) wave expression. (The product between the spatial part and the temporal part of the wave expression is a solution of the scalar wave equation.) Then, the volume part of the Green's second identity is zero, so only the surface integral remains:
$$\oint _{\partial V} \left(U_2 {\partial U_1 \over \partial {\hat {\mathbf {n} }}} - U_1 {\partial U_2 \over \partial {\hat {\mathbf {n} }}}\right)dS = 0.$$
Now $U_2$ is set to a solution of the Helmholtz equation to find and $U_1$ is set to a spatial part of a complex-valued monochromatic spherical wave, $U_1 = \frac{e^{iks}}{s}$, where $s$ is the distance from an observation point $P$ in the closed volume $V$. There is a singularity for $U_1 = \frac{e^{iks}}{s}$ at $P$ where $s=0$ (the value of $\frac{e^{iks}}{s}$ not defined at $s=0$), and the volume and surface integrals in the Green's second identity above must not include it. (A value of an integral including the singularity is not defined.) A suggested integral surface avoiding the singularity consists of two closed surfaces, one is an inner sphere $S_1$ of radius $s_1$ centered at $P$ and the other is an outer arbitrary closed surface $S_2$ that includes the inner sphere.

The surface integral becomes
$$\oint _{S_1} \left(U_2 {\partial \over \partial \hat\mathbf{n} }\frac{e^{iks}}{s} - \frac{e^{iks}}{s}{\partial \over \partial {\hat {\mathbf {n} }}} U_2 \right) dS + \oint _{S_2} \left(U_2 {\partial \over \partial \hat\mathbf n } \frac{e^{iks}}{s} - \frac{e^{iks}}{s}{\partial \over \partial \hat\mathbf{n} } U_2 \right)dS = 0.$$
For the integral on the inner sphere $S_1$,
$$\frac{\partial}{\partial\hat{\mathbf{n}}} \frac{e^{iks}}{s} = \nabla \frac{e^{iks}}{s} \cdot \hat{\mathbf{n}} = \left(\frac{ik}{s} - \frac{1}{s^2}\right) e^{iks},$$
and by introducing the solid angle $d\Omega$ in $dS = s^2 d\Omega$,
$$\begin{array}{lcl}
\oint _{S_1} \left(U_{2}{\partial \over \partial {\hat {\mathbf {n} }}} \frac{e^{iks}}{s} - \frac{e^{iks}}{s} {\partial \over \partial {\hat\mathbf {n} }} U_2 \right)dS & = & \oint _{S_1} \left(U_2 \left(\frac{ik}{s} - \frac{1}{s^2}\right)e^{iks} - \frac{e^{iks}}{s} {\partial \over \partial {\hat {\mathbf {n} }}} U_2 \right)s^2d\Omega \\
& = & \oint _{S_1} \left(iksU_2 - U_2 - s \frac{\partial}{\partial \hat{\mathbf{n}}} U_2 \right) e^{iks} d\Omega.
\end{array}$$
By shrinking the sphere $S_1$ toward the zero radius (but never touching $P$ to avoid the singularity), $e^{iks} \to 1$ and the first and last terms in the $S_1$ surface integral becomes zero, so the integral converges to $-4 \pi U_2$ (from the 2nd term as the dominant term in the integral). As a result, denoting $U_2$ to $U$, $P$ to $\mathbf{r}$, and $S_2$ to $S$, respectively, gives
$$U(\mathbf{r})=  \frac{1}{4\pi}\oint _{S} \left(U{\partial \over \partial {\hat {\mathbf {n} }}}\frac{e^{iks}}{s} - \frac{e^{iks}}{s}{\partial \over \partial {\hat {\mathbf {n} }}} U \right)dS.$$

== See also ==
- Kirchhoff's diffraction formula
- Vector calculus
- Integral
- Huygens–Fresnel principle
- Wavefront
- Surface integral
