= Vector calculus identities =

Mathematical identities

The following are important identities involving derivatives and integrals in vector calculus.

== Operator notation ==
=== Gradient ===
For a function $f(x, y, z)$ in three-dimensional Cartesian coordinate variables, the gradient is the vector field:
$$\operatorname{grad}(f) = \nabla f =
\begin{pmatrix}\displaystyle \frac{\partial }{\partial x},\ \frac{\partial }{\partial y},\ \frac{\partial }{\partial z} \end{pmatrix} f =
\frac{\partial f}{\partial x} \mathbf{i} + \frac{\partial f}{\partial y} \mathbf{j} + \frac{\partial f}{\partial z} \mathbf{k}$$
where i, j, k are the standard unit vectors for the x, y, z-axes. More generally, for a function of n variables $\psi(x_1, \ldots, x_n)$, also called a scalar field, the gradient is the vector field:
$$\nabla\psi = \begin{pmatrix}\displaystyle\frac{\partial}{\partial x_1}, \ldots, \frac{\partial}{\partial x_n} \end{pmatrix}\psi =
\frac{\partial\psi}{\partial x_1} \mathbf{e}_1 + \dots + \frac{\partial\psi}{\partial x_n}\mathbf{e}_n$$
where $\mathbf{e}_{i} \, (i=1,2,..., n)$ are mutually orthogonal unit vectors.

As the name implies, the gradient is proportional to, and points in the direction of, the function's most rapid (positive) change.

For a vector field $\mathbf{A} = \left(A_1, \ldots, A_n\right)$, also called a tensor field of order 1, the gradient or vector differential is the linear transformation from vectors to vectors whose matrix is the n × n Jacobian matrix:
$$\mathbf{J}_{\mathbf{A}} = d\mathbf{A} = (\nabla \!\mathbf{A})^\textsf{T}  = \left(\frac{\partial A_i}{\partial x_j}\right)_{\!ij}.$$

Recursive definition of tensor: A tensor of order 0 is a scalar. A tensor of order 1 is a vector. A tensor of order 2 (also called a dyadic) is a linear transformation from vectors to vectors. A tensor of order k > 2 (also called a polyadic) is a linear transformation from vectors to tensors of order k − 1.

For a tensor field $\mathbf{T}$ of any order k, the gradient $\operatorname{grad}(\mathbf{T}) = d\mathbf{T} = (\nabla \mathbf{T})^\textsf{T}$ is a tensor field of order k + 1. (Note: Note that, here, the "transpose" of the tensor ABCD is BCDA, and grad(T) is the tensor differential dT. Hence, grad(T)·A = A·(∇T).)

For a tensor field $\mathbf{T}$ of order k > 0, the tensor field $\nabla \mathbf{T}$ of order k + 1 is defined by the recursive relation
$$(\nabla \mathbf{T}) \cdot \mathbf{C} = \nabla (\mathbf{T} \cdot \mathbf{C})$$
where $\mathbf{C}$ is an arbitrary constant vector.

=== Divergence ===
In Cartesian coordinates, the divergence of a continuously differentiable vector field $\mathbf{F} = F_x\mathbf{i} + F_y\mathbf{j} + F_z\mathbf{k}$ is the scalar-valued function:
$$\begin{align}
\operatorname{div}\mathbf{F} = \nabla\cdot\mathbf{F}
&= \begin{pmatrix}\dfrac{\partial}{\partial x},\ \dfrac{\partial}{\partial y},\ \dfrac{\partial}{\partial z}\end{pmatrix} \cdot \begin{pmatrix}F_x,\ F_y,\ F_z\end{pmatrix} \\[1ex]
&= \frac{\partial F_x}{\partial x} + \frac{\partial F_y}{\partial y} + \frac{\partial F_z}{\partial z}.
\end{align}$$

As the name implies, the divergence is a (local) measure of the degree to which vectors in the field diverge.

The divergence of a tensor field $\mathbf{T}$ of non-zero order k is written as $\operatorname{div}(\mathbf{T}) = \nabla \cdot \mathbf{T}$, a contraction of a tensor field of order k − 1. Specifically, the divergence of a vector is a scalar. The divergence of a higher-order tensor field may be found by decomposing the tensor field into a sum of outer products and using the identity,
$$\nabla \cdot \left(\mathbf{A} \otimes \mathbf{T}\right) = \mathbf{T} (\nabla \cdot \mathbf{A}) + (\mathbf{A} \cdot \nabla) \mathbf{T}$$
where $\mathbf{A} \cdot \nabla$ is the directional derivative in the direction of $\mathbf{A}$ multiplied by its magnitude. Specifically, for the outer product of two vectors,
$$\nabla \cdot \left(\mathbf{A} \mathbf{B}^\textsf{T}\right) = \mathbf{B} (\nabla \cdot \mathbf{A}) + (\mathbf{A} \cdot \nabla) \mathbf{B}.$$

For a tensor field $\mathbf{T}$ of order k > 1, the tensor field $\nabla \cdot \mathbf{T}$ of order k − 1 is defined by the recursive relation
$$(\nabla \cdot \mathbf{T}) \cdot \mathbf{C} = \nabla \cdot (\mathbf{T} \cdot \mathbf{C})$$
where $\mathbf{C}$ is an arbitrary constant vector.

=== Curl ===
In Cartesian coordinates, for $\mathbf{F} = F_x\mathbf{i} + F_y\mathbf{j} + F_z\mathbf{k}$ the curl is the vector field:
$$\begin{align}
\operatorname{curl}\mathbf{F} &= \nabla \times \mathbf{F}
= \begin{pmatrix}\displaystyle\frac{\partial}{\partial x},\ \frac{\partial}{\partial y},\ \frac{\partial}{\partial z}\end{pmatrix} \times \begin{pmatrix}F_{x},\ F_{y},\ F_{z}\end{pmatrix} \\[1em]
&= \begin{vmatrix}
\mathbf{i} & \mathbf{j} & \mathbf{k} \\
\frac{\partial}{\partial x} & \frac{\partial}{\partial y} & \frac{\partial}{\partial z} \\
F_x & F_y & F_z
\end{vmatrix} \\[1em]
&= \left(\frac{\partial F_z}{\partial y} - \frac{\partial F_y}{\partial z}\right) \mathbf{i} +
\left(\frac{\partial F_x}{\partial z} - \frac{\partial F_z}{\partial x}\right) \mathbf{j} +
\left(\frac{\partial F_y}{\partial x} - \frac{\partial F_x}{\partial y}\right) \mathbf{k}
\end{align}$$
where i, j, and k are the unit vectors for the x-, y-, and z-axes, respectively.

As the name implies the curl is a measure of how much nearby vectors tend in a circular direction.

In Einstein notation, the vector field
$$\mathbf{F} = \begin{pmatrix}F_1,\ F_2,\ F_3 \end{pmatrix}$$
has curl given by:
$$\nabla \times \mathbf{F} = \varepsilon^{ijk}\mathbf{e}_i \frac{\partial F_k}{\partial x_j}$$
where $\varepsilon$ = ±1 or 0 is the Levi-Civita parity symbol.

For a tensor field $\mathbf{T}$ of order k > 1, the tensor field $\nabla \times \mathbf{T}$ of order k is defined by the recursive relation
$$(\nabla \times \mathbf{T}) \cdot \mathbf{C} = \nabla \times (\mathbf{T} \cdot \mathbf{C})$$
where $\mathbf{C}$ is an arbitrary constant vector.

A tensor field of order greater than one may be decomposed into a sum of outer products, and then the following identity may be used: (Note: The symbol ⊗ or the superscript T affixed to a vector to indicate a tensor product may be omitted throughout this article. When the vector must stand for its matrix (not in this article), however, the superscript may not be omitted. For example, tr(AB) = tr(AB^{T}) = tr(B^{T}A) = tr((B⋅A)) = B⋅A = A⋅B. On the other hand, the symbol ⊗ is used inconsistently, mysteriously appearing and disappearing, as in the equation A⋅(B⊗C) = (A⋅B)C, which ought to be written as A⋅(B⊗C) = (A⋅B)⊗C because all the factors are tensors and it is an associative law. This inconsistency makes proofs of tensor identities by mathematical induction more difficult, as in the proof of ∇×(A⊗T) = (∇×A)⊗T − A×(∇T). One must begin the induction with the case where T is a vector, because the case where it is a scalar has a different form. But for the same reason it is difficult to see how to do this. If, however, one suppresses the tensor multiplication sign ⊗ and indicates the operation by juxtaposition, then one may begin the induction with the case where T is a scalar, which is a familiar vector identity.)
$$\nabla \times \left(\mathbf{A} \otimes \mathbf{T}\right) = (\nabla \times \mathbf{A}) \otimes \mathbf{T} - \mathbf{A} \times (\nabla \mathbf{T}).$$
Specifically, for the outer product of two vectors,
$$\nabla \times \left(\mathbf{A} \mathbf{B}^\textsf{T}\right) = (\nabla \times \mathbf{A}) \mathbf{B}^\textsf{T} - \mathbf{A} \times (\nabla \mathbf{B}).$$

=== Laplacian ===
In Cartesian coordinates, the Laplacian of a function $f(x,y,z)$ is
$$\Delta f = \nabla^2\! f = (\nabla \cdot \nabla) f = \frac{\partial^2\! f}{\partial x^2} + \frac{\partial^2\! f}{\partial y^2} + \frac{\partial^2\! f}{\partial z^2}.$$

The Laplacian is a measure of how much a function is changing over a small sphere centered at the point.

When the Laplacian is equal to 0, the function is called a harmonic function. That is,
$$\Delta f = 0.$$

For a tensor field, $\mathbf{T}$, the Laplacian is generally written as:
$$\Delta\mathbf{T} = \nabla^2 \mathbf{T} = (\nabla \cdot \nabla) \mathbf{T}$$
and is a tensor field of the same order.

For a tensor field $\mathbf{T}$ of order k > 0, the tensor field $\nabla^2 \mathbf{T}$ of order k is defined by the recursive relation
$$\left(\nabla^2 \mathbf{T}\right) \cdot \mathbf{C} = \nabla^2 (\mathbf{T} \cdot \mathbf{C})$$
where $\mathbf{C}$ is an arbitrary constant vector.

=== Special notations ===
In Feynman subscript notation,
$$\nabla_\mathbf{B}\! \left( \mathbf{A {\cdot} B} \right) = \mathbf{A} {\times}\! \left( \nabla {\times} \mathbf{B} \right) + \left( \mathbf{A} {\cdot} \nabla \right) \mathbf{B}$$
where the notation ∇_{B} means the subscripted gradient operates on only the factor B.

More general but similar is the Hestenes overdot notation in geometric algebra. The above identity is then expressed as:
$$\dot{\nabla} \left( \mathbf{A} {\cdot} \dot{\mathbf{B}} \right) = \mathbf{A} {\times}\! \left( \nabla {\times} \mathbf{B} \right) + \left( \mathbf{A} {\cdot} \nabla \right) \mathbf{B}$$
where overdots define the scope of the vector derivative. The dotted vector, in this case B, is differentiated, while the (undotted) A is held constant.

The utility of the Feynman subscript notation lies in its use in the derivation of vector and tensor derivative identities, as in the following example which uses the algebraic identity C⋅(A×B) = (C×A)⋅B:

$$\begin{align}
\nabla \cdot (\mathbf{A} \times \mathbf{B})
&= \nabla_\mathbf{A} \cdot (\mathbf{A} \times \mathbf{B})
+ \nabla_\mathbf{B} \cdot (\mathbf{A} \times \mathbf{B}) \\[2pt]
&= (\nabla_\mathbf{A} \times \mathbf{A}) \cdot \mathbf{B}
+ (\nabla_\mathbf{B} \times \mathbf{A}) \cdot \mathbf{B} \\[2pt]
&= (\nabla_\mathbf{A} \times \mathbf{A}) \cdot \mathbf{B}
- (\mathbf{A} \times \nabla_\mathbf{B}) \cdot \mathbf{B} \\[2pt]
&= (\nabla_\mathbf{A} \times \mathbf{A}) \cdot \mathbf{B}
- \mathbf{A} \cdot (\nabla_\mathbf{B} \times \mathbf{B}) \\[2pt]
&= (\nabla \times \mathbf{A}) \cdot \mathbf{B}
- \mathbf{A} \cdot (\nabla \times \mathbf{B})
\end{align}$$

An alternative method is to use the Cartesian components of the del operator as follows (with implicit summation over the index i):

$$\begin{align}
\nabla \cdot (\mathbf{A} \times \mathbf{B})
&= \mathbf{e}_i \partial_i \cdot (\mathbf{A} \times \mathbf{B}) \\[2pt]
&= \mathbf{e}_i \cdot \partial_i (\mathbf{A} \times \mathbf{B}) \\[2pt]
&= \mathbf{e}_i \cdot (\partial_i \mathbf{A} \times \mathbf{B}
+ \mathbf{A} \times \partial_i \mathbf{B}) \\[2pt]
&= \mathbf{e}_i \cdot (\partial_i \mathbf{A} \times \mathbf{B})
+ \mathbf{e}_i \cdot (\mathbf{A} \times \partial_i \mathbf{B}) \\[2pt]
&= (\mathbf{e}_i \times \partial_i \mathbf{A}) \cdot \mathbf{B}
+ (\mathbf{e}_i \times \mathbf{A}) \cdot \partial_i \mathbf{B} \\[2pt]
&= (\mathbf{e}_i \times \partial_i \mathbf{A}) \cdot \mathbf{B}
- (\mathbf{A} \times \mathbf{e}_i) \cdot \partial_i \mathbf{B} \\[2pt]
&= (\mathbf{e}_i \times \partial_i \mathbf{A}) \cdot \mathbf{B}
- \mathbf{A} \cdot (\mathbf{e}_i \times \partial_i \mathbf{B}) \\[2pt]
&= (\mathbf{e}_i \partial_i \times \mathbf{A}) \cdot \mathbf{B}
- \mathbf{A} \cdot (\mathbf{e}_i \partial_i \times \mathbf{B}) \\[2pt]
&= (\nabla \times \mathbf{A}) \cdot \mathbf{B}
- \mathbf{A} \cdot (\nabla \times \mathbf{B})
\end{align}$$

Another method of deriving vector and tensor derivative identities is to replace all occurrences of a vector in an algebraic identity by the del operator, provided that no variable occurs both inside and outside the scope of an operator or both inside the scope of one operator in a term and outside the scope of another operator in the same term (i.e., the operators must be nested). The validity of this rule follows from the validity of the Feynman method, for one may always substitute a subscripted del and then immediately drop the subscript under the condition of the rule. For example, from the identity A⋅(B×C) = (A×B)⋅C we may derive A⋅(∇×C) = (A×∇)⋅C but not ∇⋅(B×C) = (∇×B)⋅C, nor from A⋅(B×A) = 0 may we derive A⋅(∇×A) = 0. On the other hand, a subscripted del operates on all occurrences of the subscript in the term, so that A⋅(∇_{A}×A) = ∇_{A}⋅(A×A) = ∇⋅(A×A) = 0. Also, from A×(A×C) = A(A⋅C) − (A⋅A)C we may derive ∇×(∇×C) = ∇(∇⋅C) − ∇^{2}C, but from (Aψ)⋅(Aφ) = (A⋅A)(ψφ) we may not derive (∇ψ)⋅(∇φ) = ∇^{2}(ψφ).

A subscript c on a quantity indicates that it is temporarily considered to be a constant. Since a constant is not a variable, when the substitution rule (see the preceding paragraph) is used it, unlike a variable, may be moved into or out of the scope of a del operator, as in the following example:

$$\begin{align}
\nabla \cdot (\mathbf{A} \times \mathbf{B})
&= \nabla \cdot (\mathbf{A} \times \mathbf{B}_\mathrm{c})
+ \nabla \cdot (\mathbf{A}_\mathrm{c} \times \mathbf{B}) \\[2pt]
&= \nabla \cdot (\mathbf{A} \times \mathbf{B}_\mathrm{c})
- \nabla \cdot (\mathbf{B} \times \mathbf{A}_\mathrm{c}) \\[2pt]
&= (\nabla \times \mathbf{A}) \cdot \mathbf{B}_\mathrm{c}
- (\nabla \times \mathbf{B}) \cdot \mathbf{A}_\mathrm{c} \\[2pt]
&= (\nabla \times \mathbf{A}) \cdot \mathbf{B}
- (\nabla \times \mathbf{B}) \cdot \mathbf{A}
\end{align}$$

Another way to indicate that a quantity is a constant is to affix it as a subscript to the scope of a del operator, as follows:
$$\nabla \left( \mathbf{A {\cdot} B} \right)_\mathbf{A} = \mathbf{A} {\times}\! \left( \nabla {\times} \mathbf{B} \right) + \left( \mathbf{A} {\cdot} \nabla \right) \mathbf{B}$$

For the remainder of this article, Feynman subscript notation will be used where appropriate.

== First derivative identities ==
For scalar fields $\psi$, $\phi$ and vector fields $\mathbf{A}$, $\mathbf{B}$, we have the following derivative identities.

=== Distributive properties ===
- $\nabla ( \psi + \phi ) = \nabla \psi + \nabla \phi$
- $\nabla ( \mathbf{A} + \mathbf{B} ) = \nabla \mathbf{A} + \nabla \mathbf{B}$
- $\nabla \cdot ( \mathbf{A} + \mathbf{B} ) = \nabla \cdot \mathbf{A} + \nabla \cdot \mathbf{B}$
- $\nabla \times ( \mathbf{A} + \mathbf{B} ) = \nabla \times \mathbf{A} + \nabla \times \mathbf{B}$

=== First derivative associative properties ===
- $( \mathbf{A} \cdot \nabla ) \psi = \mathbf{A} \cdot ( \nabla \psi )$
- $( \mathbf{A} \cdot \nabla ) \mathbf{B} = \mathbf{A} \cdot ( \nabla \mathbf{B} )$
- $( \mathbf{A} \times \nabla ) \psi = \mathbf{A} \times ( \nabla \psi )$
- $( \mathbf{A} \times \nabla ) \mathbf{B} = \mathbf{A} \times ( \nabla \mathbf{B} )$

=== Product rule for multiplication by a scalar ===
We have the following generalizations of the product rule in single-variable calculus.

- $\nabla ( \psi \phi ) = \phi \, \nabla \psi + \psi\, \nabla \phi$
- $$\begin{align}
\nabla ( \psi \mathbf{A} ) &= (\nabla \psi) \mathbf{A}^\textsf{T} + \psi \nabla \mathbf{A} \\
&= \nabla \psi \otimes \mathbf{A} + \psi\, \nabla \mathbf{A}
\end{align}$$
- $\nabla \cdot ( \psi \mathbf{A} ) = \psi\, \nabla {\cdot} \mathbf{A} + ( \nabla \psi ) \,{\cdot} \mathbf{A}$
- $\nabla {\times} ( \psi \mathbf{A} ) = \psi\, \nabla {\times} \mathbf{A} + ( \nabla \psi ) {\times} \mathbf{A}$
- $\nabla^2(\psi \phi) = \psi\,\nabla^{2\!}\phi + 2\,\nabla\! \psi\cdot\!\nabla \phi + \phi\, \nabla^{2\!}\psi$

=== Quotient rule for division by a scalar ===
- $\nabla\left(\frac{\psi}{\phi}\right) = \frac{\phi\,\nabla \psi - \psi\,\nabla\phi}{\phi^2}$
- $\nabla\left(\frac{\mathbf{A}}{\phi}\right) = \frac{\phi\,\nabla \mathbf{A} - \nabla\phi \otimes \mathbf{A}}{\phi^2}$
- $\nabla \cdot \left(\frac{\mathbf{A}}{\phi}\right) = \frac{\phi\, \nabla{\cdot} \mathbf{A} - \nabla\!\phi \cdot \mathbf{A}}{\phi^2}$
- $\nabla \times \left(\frac{\mathbf{A}}{\phi}\right) = \frac{\phi\, \nabla {\times} \mathbf{A} - \nabla\!\phi \,{\times}\, \mathbf{A}}{\phi^2}$
- $\nabla^2 \left(\frac{\psi}{\phi}\right) = \frac{\phi\, \nabla^{2\!}\psi - 2\, \phi\, \nabla\!\left(\frac{\psi}{\phi}\right) \cdot\! \nabla\phi - \psi\, \nabla^{2\!}\phi}{\phi^2}$

=== Chain rule ===
Let $f(x)$ be a one-variable function from scalars to scalars, $\mathbf{r}(t) = (x_1(t), \ldots, x_n(t))$ a parametrized curve, $\phi\!: \mathbb{R}^n \to \mathbb{R}$ a function from vectors to scalars, and $\mathbf{A}\!: \mathbb{R}^n \to \mathbb{R}^n$ a vector field. We have the following special cases of the multi-variable chain rule.

- $\nabla(f \circ \phi) = \left(f' \circ \phi\right) \nabla \phi$
- $(\mathbf{r} \circ f)' = (\mathbf{r}' \circ f) f'$
- $(\phi \circ \mathbf{r})' = (\nabla \phi \circ \mathbf{r}) \cdot \mathbf{r}'$
- $(\mathbf{A} \circ \mathbf{r})' = \mathbf{r}' \cdot (\nabla \mathbf{A} \circ \mathbf{r})$
- $\nabla(\phi \circ \mathbf{A}) = (\nabla \mathbf{A}) \cdot (\nabla \phi \circ \mathbf{A})$
- $\nabla \cdot (\mathbf{r} \circ \phi) = \nabla \phi \cdot (\mathbf{r}' \circ \phi)$
- $\nabla \times (\mathbf{r} \circ \phi) = \nabla \phi \times (\mathbf{r}' \circ \phi)$
- $\nabla (\mathbf{r}\circ\phi) = \nabla \phi \otimes (\mathbf{r}'\circ\phi)$

For a vector transformation $\mathbf{u}\!: \mathbb{R}^n \to \mathbb{R}^n$ we have:

$$\nabla \cdot (\mathbf{A} \circ \mathbf{u}) = \mathrm{tr} \left((\nabla \mathbf{u}) \cdot (\nabla \mathbf{A} \circ \mathbf{u})\right)$$

Here we take the trace of the dot product of two second-order tensors, which corresponds to the product of their matrices. (Note: The dot product of two second-order tensors is another second-order tensor, and the matrix of the product is the product of the matrices of the factors. The trace of a second-order tensor is equal to the trace of its matrix.)

=== Dot product rule ===
$$\begin{align}
\nabla(\mathbf{A} \cdot \mathbf{B}) &\ =\ (\mathbf{A} \cdot \nabla)\mathbf{B} \,+\,  (\mathbf{B} \cdot \nabla)\mathbf{A} \,+\,  \mathbf{A} {\times} (\nabla {\times} \mathbf{B}) \,+\,  \mathbf{B} {\times} (\nabla {\times} \mathbf{A}) \\
&\ =\ \mathbf{A}\cdot\mathbf{J}_\mathbf{B} + \mathbf{B}\cdot\mathbf{J}_\mathbf{A}
\ =\ (\nabla\mathbf{B})\cdot \mathbf{A} \,+\, (\nabla\mathbf{A}) \cdot\mathbf{B}
\end{align}$$

where $\mathbf{J}_{\mathbf{A}} = (\nabla \!\mathbf{A})^\textsf{T} = (\partial A_i/\partial x_j)_{ij}$ denotes the Jacobian matrix of the vector field $\mathbf{A} = (A_1,\ldots,A_n)$.

Alternatively, using Feynman subscript notation,

$$\nabla(\mathbf{A} \cdot \mathbf{B}) = \nabla_\mathbf{A}(\mathbf{A}  \cdot \mathbf{B}) +  \nabla_\mathbf{B} (\mathbf{A} \cdot \mathbf{B}) \ .$$

See these notes.

As a special case, when A = B,

$$\tfrac{1}{2} \nabla \left( \mathbf{A} \cdot \mathbf{A} \right)
\ =\ \mathbf{A} \cdot \mathbf{J}_\mathbf{A} \ =\ (\nabla \mathbf{A})\cdot \mathbf{A}\ =\ (\mathbf{A} {\cdot} \nabla) \mathbf{A} \,+\, \mathbf{A} {\times} (\nabla {\times} \mathbf{A}) \ =\ A \nabla A
.$$

The generalization of the dot product formula to Riemannian manifolds is a defining property of a Riemannian connection, which differentiates a vector field to give a vector-valued 1-form.

=== Cross product rule ===
- $\nabla (\mathbf{A} \times \mathbf{B}) \ =\ (\nabla \mathbf{A}) \times \mathbf{B} \,-\, (\nabla \mathbf{B}) \times \mathbf{A}$
- $\nabla \cdot (\mathbf{A} \times \mathbf{B}) \ =\ (\nabla {\times} \mathbf{A}) \cdot \mathbf{B} \,-\, \mathbf{A} \cdot (\nabla {\times} \mathbf{B})$
- $$\begin{align}
\nabla \times (\mathbf{A} \times \mathbf{B})
&\ =\ \mathbf{A}(\nabla {\cdot} \mathbf{B}) \,-\, \mathbf{B}(\nabla {\cdot} \mathbf{A})
\,+\, (\mathbf{B} {\cdot} \nabla) \mathbf{A} \,-\, (\mathbf{A} {\cdot} \nabla) \mathbf{B} \\[2pt]
&\ =\ \mathbf{A}(\nabla {\cdot} \mathbf{B}) \,+\, (\mathbf{B} {\cdot} \nabla) \mathbf{A}
\,-\, (\mathbf{B}(\nabla {\cdot} \mathbf{A}) \,+\, (\mathbf{A} {\cdot} \nabla) \mathbf{B}) \\[2pt]
&\ =\ \nabla {\cdot} \left(\mathbf{B} \mathbf{A}^\textsf{T}\right)
\,-\, \nabla {\cdot} \left(\mathbf{A} \mathbf{B}^\textsf{T}\right) \\[2pt]
&\ =\ \nabla {\cdot} \left(\mathbf{B} \mathbf{A}^\textsf{T} \,-\, \mathbf{A} \mathbf{B}^\textsf{T}\right)
\end{align}$$
- $$\begin{align}
\mathbf{A} \times (\nabla \times \mathbf{B})
&\ =\ \nabla_{\mathbf{B}}(\mathbf{A} {\cdot} \mathbf{B}) \,-\, (\mathbf{A} {\cdot} \nabla) \mathbf{B} \\[2pt]
&\ =\ \mathbf{A} \cdot \mathbf{J}_\mathbf{B} \,-\, (\mathbf{A} {\cdot} \nabla) \mathbf{B} \\[2pt]
&\ =\ (\nabla\mathbf{B})\cdot\mathbf{A}  \,-\, \mathbf{A} \cdot (\nabla \mathbf{B}) \\[2pt]
&\ =\ \mathbf{A} \cdot (\mathbf{J}_\mathbf{B} \,-\, \mathbf{J}_\mathbf{B}^\textsf{T}) \\[5pt]
\end{align}$$
- $$\begin{align}
(\mathbf{A} \times \nabla) \times \mathbf{B}
&\ =\ (\nabla\mathbf{B})  \cdot \mathbf{A} \,-\, \mathbf{A}  (\nabla {\cdot} \mathbf{B}) \\[2pt]
&\ =\ \mathbf{A} \times (\nabla \times \mathbf{B}) \,+\, (\mathbf{A} {\cdot} \nabla) \mathbf{B} \,-\, \mathbf{A}  (\nabla {\cdot} \mathbf{B})
\end{align}$$
- $(\mathbf{A} \times \nabla) \cdot \mathbf{B} \ =\ \mathbf{A} \cdot (\nabla {\times} \mathbf{B})$

Note that the matrix $\mathbf{J}_\mathbf{B} \,-\, \mathbf{J}_\mathbf{B}^\textsf{T}$ is antisymmetric.

== Second derivative identities ==
=== Divergence of curl is zero ===
The divergence of the curl of any continuously twice-differentiable vector field A is always zero:
$$\nabla \cdot ( \nabla \times \mathbf{A} ) = 0$$

This is a special case of the vanishing of the square of the exterior derivative in the De Rham chain complex.

=== Divergence of gradient is Laplacian ===
The Laplacian of a scalar field is the divergence of its gradient:
$$\Delta \psi = \nabla^2 \psi = \nabla \cdot (\nabla \psi)$$
The result is a scalar quantity.

=== Divergence of divergence is not defined ===
The divergence of a vector field A is a scalar, and the divergence of a scalar quantity is undefined. Therefore,
$$\nabla \cdot (\nabla \cdot \mathbf{A}) \text{ is undefined.}$$

=== Curl of gradient is zero ===
The curl of the gradient of any continuously twice-differentiable scalar field $\varphi$ (i.e., differentiability class $C^2$) is always the zero vector:
$$\nabla \times ( \nabla \varphi )  = \mathbf{0}.$$

It can be easily proved by expressing $\nabla \times ( \nabla \varphi )$ in a Cartesian coordinate system with Schwarz's theorem (also called Clairaut's theorem on equality of mixed partials). This result is a special case of the vanishing of the square of the exterior derivative in the De Rham chain complex.

=== Curl of curl ===
$$\nabla \times \left( \nabla \times \mathbf{A} \right) \ =\ \nabla(\nabla {\cdot} \mathbf{A}) \,-\, \nabla^{2\!}\mathbf{A}$$

Here ∇^{2} is the vector Laplacian operating on the vector field A.

=== Curl of divergence is not defined ===
The divergence of a vector field A is a scalar, and the curl of a scalar quantity is undefined. Therefore,
$$\nabla \times (\nabla \cdot \mathbf{A}) \text{ is undefined.}$$

=== Second derivative associative properties ===
- $( \nabla \cdot \nabla ) \psi = \nabla \cdot ( \nabla \psi ) = \nabla^2 \psi$
- $( \nabla \cdot \nabla ) \mathbf{A} = \nabla \cdot ( \nabla \mathbf{A} ) = \nabla^2 \mathbf{A}$
- $( \nabla \times \nabla ) \psi = \nabla \times ( \nabla \psi ) = \mathbf{0}$
- $( \nabla \times \nabla ) \mathbf{A} = \nabla \times ( \nabla \mathbf{A} ) = \mathbf{0}$

DCG chart: Some rules for second derivatives.

=== A mnemonic ===
The figure to the right is a mnemonic for some of these identities. The abbreviations used are:

- D: divergence,
- C: curl,
- G: gradient,
- L: Laplacian,
- CC: curl of curl.

Each arrow is labeled with the result of an identity, specifically, the result of applying the operator at the arrow's tail to the operator at its head. The blue circle in the middle means curl of curl exists, whereas the other two red circles (dashed) mean that DD and GG do not exist.

== Summary of important identities ==
=== Differentiation ===
==== Gradient ====
- $\nabla(\psi+\phi)=\nabla\psi+\nabla\phi$
- $\nabla(\psi \phi) = \phi\nabla \psi + \psi \nabla \phi$
- $\nabla(\psi \mathbf{A} ) = \nabla \psi \otimes \mathbf{A} + \psi \nabla \mathbf{A}$
- $\nabla (\mathbf{A} \otimes \mathbf{B}) = (\nabla \mathbf{A}) \otimes \mathbf{B} + \left(\mathbf{A} \otimes (\nabla \mathbf{B})^\textsf{T}\right)^\textsf{R}$ (Note: The "transpose" of the tensor ABCD may be defined as either BCDA or DABC and denoted by the superscript L (or T) or R, respectively. These are inverse operations. The definitions coincide for a second-order tensor, and the transpose of a vector is itself; the transpose of a scalar is not defined.)
- $\nabla(\mathbf{A} \cdot \mathbf{B}) = (\mathbf{A} \cdot \nabla)\mathbf{B} + (\mathbf{B} \cdot \nabla)\mathbf{A} + \mathbf{A} \times (\nabla \times \mathbf{B}) + \mathbf{B} \times (\nabla \times \mathbf{A})$

==== Divergence ====
- $\nabla\cdot(\mathbf{A}+\mathbf{B})= \nabla\cdot\mathbf{A}+\nabla\cdot\mathbf{B}$
- $\nabla\cdot\left(\psi\mathbf{A}\right)= \psi\nabla\cdot\mathbf{A}+\mathbf{A}\cdot\nabla \psi$
- $\nabla\cdot\left(\mathbf{A}\times\mathbf{B}\right)= (\nabla\times\mathbf{A})\cdot \mathbf{B}-(\nabla\times\mathbf{B})\cdot \mathbf{A}$

==== Curl ====
- $\nabla\times(\mathbf{A}+\mathbf{B}) = \nabla\times\mathbf{A}+\nabla\times\mathbf{B}$
- $\nabla\times\left(\psi\mathbf{A}\right) = \psi\,(\nabla\times\mathbf{A})-(\mathbf{A}\times\nabla)\psi=\psi\,(\nabla\times\mathbf{A})+(\nabla\psi)\times\mathbf{A}$
- $\nabla\times\left(\psi\nabla\phi\right) = \nabla \psi \times \nabla \phi$
- $\nabla\times\left(\mathbf{A}\times\mathbf{B}\right) = \mathbf{A}\left(\nabla\cdot\mathbf{B}\right)-\mathbf{B} \left( \nabla\cdot\mathbf{A}\right)+\left(\mathbf{B}\cdot\nabla\right)\mathbf{A}- \left(\mathbf{A}\cdot\nabla\right)\mathbf{B}$

==== Vector-dot-Del Operator ====
- $$\begin{align}
\left(\mathbf{A} \cdot \nabla\right) \mathbf{B} ={}& \hphantom{{}-{}} \tfrac{1}{2}\Bigl[\nabla(\mathbf{A} \cdot \mathbf{B}) - \mathbf{B}(\nabla \cdot \mathbf{A}) + \mathbf{A}(\nabla \cdot\mathbf{B})\Bigr] \\
& - \tfrac{1}{2} \Bigl[ \nabla\times(\mathbf{A} \times \mathbf{B}) + \mathbf{B}\times(\nabla \times \mathbf{A}) + \mathbf{A} \times(\nabla \times \mathbf{B})\Big]
\end{align}$$
- $$\begin{align}
\left(\mathbf{A} \cdot \nabla\right) \mathbf{A} &= \tfrac{1}{2}\nabla \left|\mathbf{A}\right|^2 - \mathbf{A} \times \left(\nabla\times\mathbf{A}\right) \\
&= \tfrac{1}{2} \nabla \left|\mathbf{A}\right|^2 + (\nabla\times\mathbf{A})\times \mathbf{A}
\end{align}$$
- $\mathbf{A} \cdot \nabla(\mathbf{B} \cdot \mathbf{C}) = \mathbf{B} \cdot (\mathbf{A} \cdot \nabla) \mathbf{C} + \mathbf{C} \cdot (\mathbf{A} \cdot \nabla) \mathbf{B}$

==== Second derivatives ====
- $\nabla \cdot (\nabla \times \mathbf{A}) = 0$
- $\nabla \times (\nabla\psi) = \mathbf{0}$
- $\nabla \cdot (\nabla\psi) = \nabla^2\psi$ (scalar Laplacian)
- $\nabla\left(\nabla \cdot \mathbf{A}\right) - \nabla \times \left(\nabla \times \mathbf{A}\right) = \nabla^2\mathbf{A}$ (vector Laplacian)
- $\nabla \cdot \big[ \nabla\mathbf{A} + (\nabla\mathbf{A})^\textsf{T} \big] = \nabla^2\mathbf{A} + \nabla ( \nabla \cdot \mathbf{A} )$
- $\nabla \cdot (\phi\nabla\psi) = \phi\nabla^2\psi + \nabla\phi \cdot \nabla\psi$
- $\psi\nabla^2\phi - \phi\nabla^2\psi = \nabla \cdot \left(\psi\nabla\phi - \phi\nabla\psi\right)$
- $\nabla^2(\phi\psi) = \phi\nabla^2\psi + 2(\nabla\phi) \cdot(\nabla\psi) + \left(\nabla^2\phi\right)\psi$
- $\nabla^2(\psi\mathbf{A}) = \mathbf{A}\nabla^2\psi + 2(\nabla\psi \cdot \nabla)\mathbf{A} + \psi\nabla^2\mathbf{A}$
- $\nabla^2 (\mathbf{A} \otimes \mathbf{B}) = \left(\nabla^2 \mathbf{A}\right) \otimes \mathbf{B} + 2(\nabla \mathbf{A})^\textsf{T} \cdot (\nabla \mathbf{B}) + \mathbf{A} \otimes \left(\nabla^2 \mathbf{B}\right)$
- $\nabla\cdot\big[(\mathbf{A}\cdot\nabla)\mathbf{B}\big] = (\mathbf{A}\cdot\nabla)(\nabla\cdot\mathbf{B}) + (\nabla\mathbf{A})\,\underline{:}\,(\nabla\mathbf{B})$
- $\nabla \times \left[ \left( \mathbf{A} \cdot \nabla \right) \mathbf{A} \right] + \left[ \left( \nabla \times \mathbf{A} \right) \cdot \nabla \right] \mathbf{A} = \left[ \left(\mathbf{A} \cdot \nabla \right) + \left(\nabla \cdot \mathbf{A}\right) \right] \left( \nabla \times \mathbf{A} \right)$
- $\nabla^2(\mathbf{A} \cdot \mathbf{B}) = \mathbf{A} \cdot \nabla^2\mathbf{B} - \mathbf{B} \cdot \nabla^2\!\mathbf{A} + 2\nabla \cdot ((\mathbf{B} \cdot \nabla)\mathbf{A} + \mathbf{B} \times (\nabla \times \mathbf{A}))$ (Green's vector identity)

Note: On the double–dot product operator $\underline{:}$ above, see Product of dyadic and dyadic.

==== Third derivatives ====
- $\nabla^2(\nabla\psi) = \nabla(\nabla \cdot (\nabla\psi)) = \nabla\left(\nabla^2\psi\right)$
- $\nabla^2(\nabla \cdot \mathbf{A}) = \nabla \cdot (\nabla(\nabla \cdot \mathbf{A})) = \nabla \cdot \left(\nabla^2\mathbf{A}\right)$
- $\nabla^{2}(\nabla\times\mathbf{A}) = -\nabla \times (\nabla \times (\nabla \times \mathbf{A})) = \nabla \times \left(\nabla^2\mathbf{A}\right)$

=== Integration ===
Below, the curly symbol ∂ means "boundary of" a surface or solid.

==== Surface–volume integrals ====
In the following surface–volume integral theorems, V denotes a three-dimensional volume with a corresponding two-dimensional boundary S = ∂V (a closed surface):

- $\scriptstyle \partial V$ $\psi\,d\mathbf{S}\ =\ \iiint_V \nabla\psi\,dV$
- $\scriptstyle \partial V$ $\mathbf{A} \cdot d\mathbf{S}\ =\ \iiint_V \nabla \cdot \mathbf{A}\,dV$ (divergence theorem)
- $\scriptstyle \partial V$ $\mathbf{A} \times d\mathbf{S}\ =\ -\iiint_V \nabla \times \mathbf{A}\,dV$
- $\scriptstyle \partial V$ $\psi \nabla\!\varphi \cdot d\mathbf{S}\ =\ \iiint_V \left(\psi\nabla^2 \!\varphi + \nabla\!\varphi \cdot \nabla\!\psi\right)\,dV$ (Green's first identity)
- $\scriptstyle \partial V$ $\left(\psi\nabla\!\varphi - \varphi\nabla\!\psi\right) \cdot d\mathbf{S} \ =\$ $\scriptstyle \partial V$ $\left(\psi\frac{\partial\varphi}{\partial n} - \varphi\frac{\partial\psi}{\partial n}\right)dS$ $\displaystyle\ =\ \iiint_{V}\left(\psi\nabla^2\!\varphi - \varphi\nabla^2\!\psi\right)\,dV$ (Green's second identity)
- $\iiint_V \mathbf{A} \cdot \nabla\psi\,dV\ =\$ $\scriptstyle \partial V$ $\psi\mathbf{A} \cdot d\mathbf{S} - \iiint_V \psi\nabla \cdot \mathbf{A}\,dV$ (integration by parts)
- $\iiint_V \psi\nabla \cdot \mathbf{A}\,dV\ =\$ $\scriptstyle \partial V$ $\psi\mathbf{A} \cdot d\mathbf{S} - \iiint_V \mathbf{A} \cdot \nabla\psi\,dV$ (integration by parts)
- $\iiint_V \mathbf{A} \cdot \left(\nabla \times \mathbf{B}\right)\,dV\ =\ -$ $\scriptstyle \partial V$ $\left(\mathbf{A} \times \mathbf{B}\right) \cdot d\mathbf{S} + \iiint_V \left(\nabla \times \mathbf{A}\right) \cdot \mathbf{B}\,dV$ (integration by parts)
- $\scriptstyle \partial V$ $\mathbf{A} \times \left(d\mathbf{S} \cdot \left(\mathbf{B} \mathbf{C}^\textsf{T}\right)\right)\ =\ \iiint_V \mathbf{A} \times \left(\nabla \cdot \left(\mathbf{B} \mathbf{C}^\textsf{T}\right)\right)\,dV + \iiint_V \mathbf{B} \cdot (\nabla \mathbf{A}) \times \mathbf{C}\,dV$
- $\iiint_V \left(\nabla\cdot \mathbf B +\mathbf B\cdot\nabla \right)\mathbf{A} \,dV\ =\$ $\scriptstyle \partial V$ $\left( \mathbf B\cdot d\mathbf S\right)\mathbf A$

==== Curve–surface integrals ====
In the following curve–surface integral theorems, S denotes a 2d open surface with a corresponding 1d boundary C = ∂S (a closed curve):

- $\oint_{\partial S}\mathbf{A}\cdot d\boldsymbol{\ell}\ =\ \iint_{S}\left(\nabla \times \mathbf{A}\right)\cdot d\mathbf{S}$ (Stokes' theorem)
- $\oint_{\partial S}\psi\, d\boldsymbol{\ell}\ =\ -\iint_{S} \nabla\psi \times d\mathbf{S}$
- $\oint_{\partial S}\mathbf{A}\times d\boldsymbol{\ell}\ =\ -\iint_{S}\left(\nabla \mathbf{A} - (\nabla \cdot \mathbf{A})\mathbf{1}\right)\cdot d\mathbf{S}\ =\ -\iint_{S}\left(d\mathbf{S} \times \nabla\right)\times \mathbf{A}$
- $\oint_{\partial S}\mathbf{A}\times (\mathbf{B}\times d\boldsymbol{\ell})\ =\ \iint_{S}\left(\nabla \times \left(\mathbf{A} \mathbf{B}^\textsf{T}\right)\right)\cdot d\mathbf{S} + \iint_{S}\left(\nabla \cdot \left(\mathbf{B} \mathbf{A}^\textsf{T}\right)\right)\times d\mathbf{S}$
- $\oint_{\partial S} (\mathbf B\cdot d\boldsymbol{\ell})\mathbf A=\iint_{S}(d\mathbf{S}\cdot\left[\nabla \times\mathbf B-\mathbf B\times\nabla\right])\mathbf A$

Integration around a closed curve in the clockwise sense is the negative of the same line integral in the counterclockwise sense (analogous to interchanging the limits in a definite integral):

${\scriptstyle \partial S}$ $\mathbf{A}\cdot d\boldsymbol{\ell} = -$ ${\scriptstyle \partial S}$ $\mathbf{A}\cdot d\boldsymbol{\ell}.$

==== Endpoint-curve integrals ====
In the following endpoint–curve integral theorems, P denotes a 1d open path with signed 0d boundary points $\mathbf{q}-\mathbf{p} = \partial P$ and integration along P is from $\mathbf{p}$ to $\mathbf{q}$:

- $\psi|_{\partial P} = \psi(\mathbf{q})-\psi(\mathbf{p}) = \int_{P} \nabla\psi\cdot d\boldsymbol{\ell}$ (gradient theorem)
- $\mathbf{A}|_{\partial P} = \mathbf{A}(\mathbf{q})-\mathbf{A}(\mathbf{p}) = \int_{P} \left(d\boldsymbol{\ell} \cdot \nabla\right)\mathbf{A}$
- $\mathbf{A}|_{\partial P} = \mathbf{A}(\mathbf{q})-\mathbf{A}(\mathbf{p}) = \int_{P} \left(\nabla\mathbf{A}\right) \cdot d\boldsymbol{\ell} + \int_{P} \left(\nabla \times \mathbf{A}\right) \times d\boldsymbol{\ell}$

==== Tensor integrals ====
A tensor form of a vector integral theorem may be obtained by replacing the vector (or one of them) by a tensor, provided that the vector is first made to appear only as the right-most vector of each integrand. For example, Stokes' theorem becomes

$$\oint_{\partial S} d\boldsymbol{\ell}\cdot\mathbf{T}\ =\ \iint_{S} d\mathbf{S}\cdot\left(\nabla \times \mathbf{T}\right) .$$

A scalar field may also be treated as a vector and replaced by a vector or tensor. For example, Green's first identity becomes

$\scriptstyle \partial V$ $\psi\,d\mathbf{S} \cdot \nabla\!\mathbf{A}\ =\ \iiint_V \left(\psi\nabla^2 \!\mathbf{A} + \nabla\!\psi \cdot \nabla\!\mathbf{A}\right)\,dV$.

Similar rules apply to algebraic and differentiation formulas. For algebraic formulas one may alternatively use the left-most vector position.

== See also ==
- Comparison of vector algebra and geometric algebra
- Del in cylindrical and spherical coordinates – Mathematical gradient operator in certain coordinate systems
- Differentiation rules – Rules for computing derivatives of functions
- Exterior calculus identities
- Exterior derivative – Operation on differential forms
- List of limits
- Table of derivatives – Rules for computing derivatives of functions
- Vector algebra relations – Formulas about vectors in three-dimensional Euclidean space
