= AKNS system =

System of partial differential equations

In mathematics, the AKNS system is an integrable system of partial differential equations, introduced by and named after Mark J. Ablowitz, David J. Kaup, Alan C. Newell, and Harvey Segur from their publication in Studies in Applied Mathematics: Ablowitz, Kaup, and Newell et al. (1974).

== Definition ==
The AKNS system is a pair of two partial differential equations for two complex-valued functions p and q of 2 variables t and x:

$$p_t=+ip^2q-\frac{i}{2}p_{xx}$$
$$q_t=-iq^2p+\frac{i}{2}q_{xx}$$

If p and q are complex conjugates this reduces to the nonlinear Schrödinger equation.

Huygens' principle applied to the Dirac operator gives rise to the AKNS hierarchy.

== Applications to General Relativity ==
In October of 2021, the dynamics of three-dimensional (extremal) black holes on General Relativity with negative cosmological constant were shown equivalent to two independent copies of the AKNS system. This duality was addressed through the imposition of suitable boundary conditions to the Chern-Simons action. In this scheme, the involution of conserved charges of the AKNS system yields an infinite-dimensional commuting asymptotic symmetry algebra of gravitational charges.

== See also ==
- Huygens principle
