= Kirchhoff's diffraction formula =

Physics formula

Kirchhoff's diffraction formula (also called Fresnel–Kirchhoff diffraction formula) approximates light intensity and phase in optical diffraction: light fields in the boundary regions of shadows. The approximation can be used to model light propagation in a wide range of configurations, either analytically or using numerical modelling. It gives an expression for the wave disturbance when a monochromatic spherical wave is the incoming wave of a situation under consideration. This formula is derived by applying the Kirchhoff integral theorem, which uses the Green's second identity to derive the solution to the homogeneous scalar wave equation, to a spherical wave with some approximations.

The Huygens–Fresnel principle can be derived by the Fresnel–Kirchhoff diffraction formula.

== Derivation of Kirchhoff's diffraction formula ==
Kirchhoff's integral theorem, sometimes referred to as the Fresnel–Kirchhoff integral theorem, uses Green's second identity to derive the solution of the homogeneous monochromatic scalar wave equation at an arbitrary spatial position P in terms of the solution of the wave equation and its first order derivative at all points on an arbitrary closed surface $S$ as the boundary of some volume including P.

The solution provided by the integral theorem for a monochromatic source is
$$U(\textbf{P}) = \frac{1}{4\pi} \int_{S} \left[ U \frac{\partial}{\partial \hat{\mathbf{n}}} \left( \frac{e^{iks}}{s} \right) - \frac{e^{iks}}{s} \frac{\partial U}{\partial \hat{\mathbf{n}}} \right]dS,$$
where $U$ is the spatial part of the solution of the homogeneous scalar wave equation (i.e., $V(\mathbf{r},t) = U(\mathbf{r}) e^{-i\omega t}$ as the homogeneous scalar wave equation solution), k is the wavenumber, and s is the distance from P to an (infinitesimally small) integral surface element, and $\frac{\partial f}{\partial \hat{\mathbf{n}}}$ is a normal derivative, that is a derivative of the function $f$ along the unit normal vector $\hat{\mathbf{n}}$ of an integral surface element $dS$. The surface normal unit vector $\hat{\mathbf{n}}$ is toward the inside of the enclosed volume in this integral.

In deriving the Kirchhoff's diffraction formula, following assumptions are made:

- The distance between a point source P_{0} of a spherical wave and an integral area, and the distance between the integral area and an observation point P, are much greater than the wave wavelength $\lambda$.
- A wave on the aperture is same to the wave that would be present if there was no wave obstacle. (Note: This assumption may be expressed differently: the dimension of opening (aperture) is much greater than the wave wavelength $\lambda$.)
- $U$ and $\frac{\partial U}{\partial \hat{\mathbf{n}}} = \nabla U \cdot \hat{\mathbf{n}}$ are zero at the obstacle.

The 2nd and 3rd conditions are called Kirchhoff's boundary conditions, and they together lead to a physically incorrectly condition that the calculated wave is discontinuous at the aperture boundaries.

=== Point source ===
A geometrical arrangement to derive the Kirchhoff's diffraction formula. A screen is consisted of an aperture A_{1} (opening) and opaque areas A_{2}. A_{3} is a part of a sphere of radius R centered at C. The Kirchhoff's integral theorem is applied to the closed surface consisted of these 3 areas.

Consider a monochromatic spherical wave point source at P_{0}, which illuminates an aperture A_{1} in a screen as shown in the right figure. The intensity of the wave emitted by the point source falls off as the inverse square of the distance traveled, so the amplitude falls off as the inverse of the distance. The complex amplitude of the disturbance at a distance $r$ is given by

$$U(r) = \frac{a e^{ikr}}{r},$$
where $a$ represents the magnitude of the disturbance at the point source.

The disturbance at a spatial position P can be found by applying the Kirchhoff's integral theorem to the closed surface formed by the screen, consisted of A_{1} and A_{2}, and a unblocked part of a sphere of radius R centered at C, A_{3}. The integration is performed over the areas A_{1}, A_{2} and A_{3}, giving
$$U(\mathbf{P}) = \frac{1}{4\pi} \left[\int_{A_1} + \int_{A_2} + \int_{A_3} \right]\left( U \frac{\partial}{\partial \hat{\mathbf{n}}} \left( \frac{e^{iks}}{s} \right) - \frac{e^{iks}}{s} \frac{\partial U}{\partial \hat{\mathbf{n}}} \right) dS.$$

To solve the equation, it is assumed that the values of $U$ and $\frac{\partial U}{\partial \hat{\mathbf{n}}}$ in the aperture area A_{1} are the same as when the screen is not present (1st assumption of the Kirchhoff's diffraction formula, one of two Kirchhoff's boundary conditions), so at the position Q on the aperture,
$$U_{A_1} = \frac{a e^{ikr}}{r},$$
$$\frac{\partial U_{A_1}}{\partial \hat{\mathbf{n}}} = \nabla U_{A_1} \cdot \hat{\mathbf{n}} = \frac{ae^{ikr}}{r} \left[ik - \frac{1}{r} \right] \cos(\hat{\mathbf{n}},r),$$
(Note: The del operator $\nabla$ is in terms of independent variables of the functions $\frac{e^{iks}}{s}$ and $U$. Here $U = U_{A_1} = \frac{a e^{ikr}}{r}$.)where $r$ is the length of the straight line P_{0}Q, and $(\hat{\mathbf{n}},r)$ is the angle between a straightly extended version of P_{0}Q (the extension is directed from P_{0} to Q) and the (inward) unit normal vector $\hat{\mathbf{n}}$ to the aperture. Note that $0 < (\hat{\mathbf{n}},r) < \frac{\pi}{2}$ so $\cos(\hat{\mathbf{n}},r)$ is a positive real number on A_{1}.

At Q, we also have
$$\frac{\partial}{\partial \hat{\mathbf{n}}} \left( \frac{e^{iks}}{s} \right) = \frac{e^{iks}}{s} \left[ik - \frac{1}{s} \right] \cos(\hat{\mathbf{n}},s),$$
where $s$ is the length of the straight line PQ, and $(\hat{\mathbf{n}},s)$ is the angle between a straightly extended version of PQ (the extension is directed from P to Q) and the (inward) normal $\hat{\mathbf{n}}$ to the aperture. Note that $\frac{\pi}{2} < (\hat{\mathbf{n}},s) < \frac{3 \pi}{2}$ so $\cos(\hat{\mathbf{n}},s)$ is a negative real number on A_{1}.

Two more following assumptions are made.

- (2nd assumption of the Kirchhoff's diffraction formula) In the above normal derivatives, the terms $\frac{1}{r}$ and $\frac{1}{s}$ in both square brackets are assumed to be negligible compared with the wavenumber $k=\frac{2\pi}{\lambda}$, means $r$ and $s$ are much greater than the wavelength $\lambda$. Thus,
  $$\begin{array}{lcr}
\frac{\partial U_{A_1}}{\partial \hat{\mathbf{n}}} & \approx & ik \frac{ae^{ikr}}{r} \cos(\hat{\mathbf{n}},r), \\
\frac{\partial}{\partial \hat{\mathbf{n}}} \left( \frac{e^{iks}}{s} \right) & \approx & ik \frac{e^{iks}}{s} \cos(\hat{\mathbf{n}},s).
\end{array}$$
- (3rd assumption of the Kirchhoff's diffraction formula, one of the two Kirchhoff's boundary conditions) Kirchhoff assumes that the values of $U$ and $\frac{\partial U}{\partial \hat{\mathbf{n}}}$ on the opaque areas marked by A_{2} are zero. This implies that $U$ and $\frac{\partial U}{\partial \hat{\mathbf{n}}}$ are discontinuous at the edge of the aperture A_{1}. Of course this is generally not the case.

The contribution from A_{3} to the integral is expected to be zero, and it can be justified by one of the following reasons. (The 2nd one is preferred as the 1st one has a physical flaw.)

1. Make the assumption that the source starts to radiate at a particular time, and make R large enough, so that when the disturbance at P is being considered, no contributions from A_{3} will have arrived there. Such a wave is no longer monochromatic, since a monochromatic wave must exist at all times, while the monochromaticity is assumed in the Kirchhoff's diffraction formula. This physically flawed assumption is not necessary, and a more formal argument avoiding it has been derived.
2. A wave emanated from the aperture A_{1} is expected to evolve toward a spherical wave as it propagates. (Note: Water wave examples of this can be found in many pictures showing that a water wave passes through a relatively narrow opening and then the wave evolves to a spherical wave as it propagates away from the opening.) So, if R is large enough, then the wave on A_{3} is $U_{A_3}(r') \approx \frac{b e^{ikr'}}{r'}$ with $r'$ being the distance from the center of the aperture A_{1}, thus the integral on A_{3} becomes
  $$\begin{array}{lcl}
U(\mathbf{P}) & = & \frac{1}{4\pi} \int \left[ U \frac{\partial}{\partial \hat{\mathbf{n}}} \left( \frac{e^{iks}}{s} \right) - \frac{e^{iks}}{s} \frac{\partial U}{\partial \hat{\mathbf{n}}} \right] dA_3\\
& \sim & \frac{1}{4\pi} \int \left[ \frac{b e^{ikr'}}{r'}  ik \frac{e^{iks}}{s} \cos(\hat{\mathbf{n}},s) - \frac{e^{iks}}{s} ik \frac{be^{ikr'}}{r'} \cos(\hat{\mathbf{n}},r') \right] dA_3 \\
& = & \frac{ik}{4\pi} \frac{b e^{ik(r'+s)}}{r's} \int \left[ \cos(\hat{\mathbf{n}},s) - \cos(\hat{\mathbf{n}},r') \right] dA_3 \\
& \sim & \frac{ib}{2\lambda} \frac{e^{ik(r'+s)}}{r'^2} \int \left[ \cos(\hat{\mathbf{n}},r') - \cos(\hat{\mathbf{n}},r') \right] dA_3 \\
& = & 0
\end{array}$$
  where $r'$ is the distance from the center of the aperture A_{1} to an integral surface element.

As a result, finally, the integral above, which represents the complex amplitude at P, becomes
$$U(\mathbf{P}) \approx -\frac{ia}{2\lambda} \int_{A_1} \frac{e^{ik(r+s)}}{rs} [\cos(\hat{\mathbf{n}},r) - \cos(\hat{\mathbf{n}},s)] d{A_1}.$$

This is the Kirchhoff or Fresnel–Kirchhoff diffraction formula.

This formula can also be derived by using a different geometry in which non-physical (no so wave blocking) arbitrary closed surface, that is apart from the point wave source P_{0} and surrounds the observation point P, is the integral surface to which the Kirchhoff's integral theorem is applied. In this geometry, among three assumptions made above, only the 2nd assumption - $r$ (The distance between P_{0} and an element of the integral surface) and $s$ (The distance between the integral surface element and P) are much greater than the wavelength $\lambda$ - is required. The result is the same integral form of the Fresnel–Kirchhoff diffraction formula above, except that the integral surface is the chosen closed surface.

==== Equivalence to Huygens–Fresnel principle ====
A geometric arrangement used to express the Kirchhoff's diffraction formula in a form similar to the Huygens–Fresnel principle.

The Huygens–Fresnel principle can be derived by integrating over a different closed surface (the boundary of some volume having an observation point P). In the right diagram, the aperture area A_{1} in the diagram of the above section is replaced by (1) a part of a wavefront (emitted from a P_{0}) at r_{0}, which is the closest to the aperture, and (2) a portion of a cone with a vertex at P_{0}, labelled A_{4}, that is straight lines perpendicular to the wavefront and between the wavefront and the edges of the aperture. If the wavefront is positioned such that the wavefront is very close to the edges of the aperture, then the contribution from A_{4} can be neglected (an additional assumption on the top of three assumptions used to derive the Kirchhoff's diffraction formula above). On this new A_{1}, the inward (toward the volume enclosed by the closed integral surface, so toward the right side in the diagram) normal $\hat{\mathbf{n}}$ to A_{1} is along the radial direction from P_{0}, i.e., the direction perpendicular to the wavefront. As a result, the angle $(\hat{\mathbf{n}},r)=0$ and the angle $(\hat{\mathbf{n}},s)$ is related with the angle $\chi$ (the angle as defined in Huygens–Fresnel principle) as
$$(\hat{\mathbf{n}},s) = \pi - \chi.$$

The complex amplitude of the wavefront at r_{0} is given by
$$U(r_0) = \frac{ae^{ikr_0}}{r_0}.$$

So, the diffraction formula in the above section becomes
$$U(\mathbf{P}) \approx -\frac{i}{2\lambda} \frac{ae^{ikr_0}}{r_0} \int_{S} \frac{e^{iks}}{s} (1 + \cos\chi) dS,$$
where the integral is done over the part of the wavefront at r_{0} which is the closest to the aperture in the diagram. This integral leads to the Huygens–Fresnel principle (with the obliquity factor $\frac {1 + \cos\chi}{2}$).

In the derivation of this integral, instead of the geometry depicted in the diagram of this section, two closed surfaces (no physical surfaces so they do not block waves), one is a sphere of radius r_{0} centered at the point wave source P_{0}, and the other is an arbitrary closed surface that contains this inner sphere and is infinitely far from it (e.g., another sphere of infinite radius), can be used. In this geometry, the observation point P is located in the volume enclosed by these closed surfaces, so the Fresnel-Kirchhoff diffraction formula is applied on the two spheres. (The surface normal on these integral surfaces are, say again, toward the enclosed volume.) In the formula application to this geometry, the additional assumption of neglecting the integral on A4, used in the above diagram of this section, is not required. The integral on the outer surface is zero as long as it is infinitely far from P, so as a result, the Huygens–Fresnel principle in the same integral from above is derived, except that the integral surface is the inner sphere.

=== Extended source ===
Assume that an aperture is illuminated by waves from an extended monochromatic wave source. The complex wave amplitude in the aperture is given by $U(\mathbf{r})$. (Note: For the spherical wave point source described above, it is $\frac{a e^{ikr}}{r}$.)

It is assumed, as before, that the values of $U$ and $\frac{\partial U}{\partial \hat{\mathbf{n}}}$ in the area A_{1} are the same as when a screen having the aperture is not present, that the values of $U$ and $\frac{\partial U}{\partial \hat{\mathbf{n}}}$ in A_{2} are zero (Kirchhoff's boundary conditions), and that 1/s is negligible compared with a wavenumber k (s is much greater than the wavelength $\lambda$) (Note: This is a part of the 2nd assumption used to derive the Kirchhoff's diffraction formula for a spherical wave point source.). By the same logic as before, the integral over A_{3} is zero. By applying the Kirchhoff's integral theorem to A_{1}, we then have
$$U(\mathbf{P}) \approx \frac{1}{4\pi} \int_{A_1} \frac{e^{iks}}{s} \left[ ik U(\mathbf{r}) \cos(\hat{\mathbf{n}},s) - \frac{\partial U(\mathbf{r})}{\partial \hat{\mathbf{n}}} \right]\, dS.$$

This is the most general form of the Kirchhoff diffraction formula (without specifying a form of wave $U(\mathbf{r})$ in the aperture).

To solve this formula for an extended wave source, an additional integration would be required to sum contributions from individual points in the source, or the following general expression of a wave can be used,
$$U(\mathbf{r}) = a(\mathbf{r}) e^{i\mathbf{k \left( \mathbf{r} \right)} \cdot \mathbf{r}}$$
where $a(\mathbf{r})$ is the magnitude of the disturbance at the point $\mathbf{r}$ in the aperture. We then have (denoting $\mathbf{k}$ instead of $\mathbf{k \left( \mathbf{r} \right)}$ for writing simplicity)
$$\begin{align}
\frac{\partial {U(\mathbf{r})}}{\partial \hat{\mathbf{n}}} & = \nabla U(\mathbf{r}) \cdot \hat{\mathbf{n}} \\
& = \left( e^{i\mathbf{k}\cdot \mathbf{r}} \nabla a(\mathbf{r}) + a(\mathbf{r})e^{i\mathbf{k}\cdot \mathbf{r}}i \nabla \left( \mathbf{k} \cdot \mathbf{r} \right) \right) \cdot \hat{\mathbf{n}} \\
& \approx a(\mathbf{r})e^{i\mathbf{k}\cdot \mathbf{r}}i\nabla \left( \mathbf{k} \cdot \mathbf{r} \right) \cdot \hat{\mathbf{n}} \\
& = ik a(\mathbf{r})e^{i\mathbf{k}\cdot \mathbf{r}} \nabla \left( \hat{\mathbf{k}} \cdot \mathbf{r} \right) \cdot \hat{\mathbf{n}}
\end{align}$$
where the approximation here is made by assuming a slowly varying wave magnitude ($\left | \nabla a(\mathbf{r}) \right | << \left | a(\mathbf{r})i \nabla \left( \mathbf{k} \cdot \mathbf{r} \right) \right |$ (Note: To compare $\left | a(\mathbf{r})i \nabla \left( \mathbf{k} \cdot \mathbf{r} \right) \right |$ with $\left | \nabla a(\mathbf{r}) \right |$, consider a simple case where $\mathbf{k} \left( \mathbf{r} \right) = \mathbf{k}$ as a constant vector. In this case, $\left | a(\mathbf{r})i\mathbf{k} \right | = \frac{2\pi a(\mathbf{r})}{\lambda}$ is interpreted as a derivative, as the ratio of an increase by $2\pi a(\mathbf{r})$ to a displacement by $\lambda$, which is a very rapid change in $a(\mathbf{r})$. $a(\mathbf{r})$ in most cases is much slowly varying then this.)). Thus,
$$U(\mathbf{P}) \approx -\frac{i}{2\lambda} \int_S a(\mathbf{r}) \frac{e^{iks} e^{i\mathbf{k} \cdot \mathbf{r}}}{s} [\nabla \left( \hat{\mathbf{k}} \cdot \mathbf{r} \right) \cdot \hat{\mathbf{n}} - \cos(\hat{\mathbf{n}},s)]\, dS$$
For a spherical wave-like wave $U_0(r) = a(r) e^{ikr},$ it becomes
$$\begin{align}
U(\mathbf{P}) & \approx -\frac{i}{2\lambda} \int_S a(r) \frac{e^{ik(s+r)}}{s} [\cos(\hat{\mathbf{n}},r) - \cos\left( \hat{\mathbf{n}},s \right)]\, ds \\
& = -\frac{i}{2\lambda} \int_S a(r) \frac{e^{ik(s+r)}}{s} [\cos(\hat{\mathbf{n}},r) + \cos\chi]\, dS
\end{align}$$
where $(\hat{\mathbf{n}},s) = \pi - \chi$ so $\cos (\hat{\mathbf{n}},s) = - \cos \chi$, where $\chi$ is an angle between the surface normal $\hat{\mathbf{n}}$ and the line PQ at Q in the diagram here, is used.

== Fraunhofer and Fresnel diffraction equations ==
In spite of the various approximations that were made in arriving at the Kirchhoff's diffraction formula, (Note: A high-level overview of how to drive the Kirchhoff's diffraction formula is the following. (1) An infinitely long opaque screen with an aperture (through which light can pass) is placed, a monochromatic spherical wave point source P_{0} is located in one of its sides (e.g., the left to the screen), and an observation point P is located in the other side (e.g., the right to the screen). (2) A closed surface is defined such that it is made of the screen and a part of a very large sphere (the part not blocked by the screen) surrounding P. (3) The Kirchhoff integral theorem is applied on this closed surface. In applying the theorem, the Kirchhoff's boundary conditions (The wave on the aperture is not disturbed by the screen, and the wave and its directional derivative along the surface unit normal vectors to the opaque part of the screen are zero.), and an assumption that the distances of P_{0} and P to the aperture is much larger than the wavelength $\lambda$, are assumed.) the formula is adequate to describe the majority of problems in instrumental optics. This is mainly because the wavelength of light is much smaller than the dimensions of any obstacles encountered by the light in many problems under consideration. Analytical solutions are not possible for most configurations, but the Fresnel diffraction equation and Fraunhofer diffraction equation, which are approximations of the Kirchhoff's formula for the near field and far field respectively, can be applied to a very wide range of optical systems.

In deriving the Fresnel and Fraunhofer diffraction equations from the Kirchhoff's diffraction formula, the following assumption is made:

- The triangle P_{0}QP is stretched along the edge P_{0}P such that the edge is approximately parallel to other edges P_{0}Q and QP.
  - It implies that the maximum aperture length (height or width) is much smaller than the lengths of P_{0}Q (that is r), and QP (that is s).

Then, the following formula simplification can be made:

- cos(n, r) − cos(n, s) is approximately replaced with 2cos β, where β is the angle between P_{0}P and the normal to the aperture. (Note: In this approximation, $\beta \approx \chi$, $(\hat{\mathbf{n}},r) \approx \beta$, and $(\hat{\mathbf{n}},s) \approx \pi - \beta$., so $\cos(\hat{\mathbf{n}},r) - \cos(\hat{\mathbf{n}},s) \approx 2 \cos \beta$.) The factor 1/rs is approximately replaced with 1/r_{c}s_{c}, where r_{c} and s_{c} are the distances of P_{0} and P to the origin O located on the aperture. Then, given the aperture (denoted by $S$ from now on), P_{0}, and P, the Kirchhoff's diffraction formula becomes:
  $$U(\mathbf{P}) \approx -\frac{ia}{2\lambda} \int_{S} \frac{e^{ik(r+s)}}{rs} [\cos(\hat{\mathbf{n}},r) - \cos(\hat{\mathbf{n}},s)] d{S} \approx -\frac{ia \cos\beta}{\lambda r_\mathbf{c} s_\mathbf{c}} \int_{S} e^{ik(r+s)}\,dS.$$

Let the aperture lies in the xy plane of a Cartesian coordinate system, and the coordinates of P_{0}, P and Q (a general point in the aperture) (Note: The origin of the coordinate system is on the aperture S. (The natural choice is the origin being at the aperture center.)) are $\left( x_0, y_0, z_0 \right)$, $\left( x,y,z \right)$, and $\left(x',y',0\right)$ respectively. We then have (r and s being the distances of P_{0} and P to Q respectively):

$$~r^2 = (x_0 - x')^2 + (y_0 - y')^2 + z_0^2,$$
$$~s^2 = (x - x')^2 + (y - y')^2 + z^2,$$
$$~r_\mathbf{c}^2 = x_0^2 + y_0^2 + z_0^2,$$
$$~s_\mathbf{c}^2 = x^2 + y^2 + z^2.$$

We can express r and s as follows:
$$r = r_\mathbf{c}\left[1 - \frac{2(x_0x' + y_0y')}{r_\mathbf{c}^2} + \frac{x'^2 + y'^2}{r_\mathbf{c}^2}\right]^{1/2},$$
$$s = s_\mathbf{c}\left[1 - \frac{2(xx' + yy')}{s_\mathbf{c}^2} + \frac{x'^2 + y'^2}{s_\mathbf{c}^2}\right]^{1/2}.$$

These can be expanded as power series:
$$\begin{alignat}{4}
r & = r_\mathbf{c}\left[1 - \frac{1}{2r_\mathbf{c}^2}\left[2(x_0x' + y_0y') - (x'^2 + y'^2)\right] + \frac{1}{8r_\mathbf{c}^4}\left[2(x_0x' + y_0y') - (x'^2 + y'^2)\right]^2 + \cdots\right] \\
& = r_c - \frac{1}{2r_\mathbf{c}}\left[2(x_0x' + y_0y') - (x'^2 + y'^2)\right] + \frac{1}{8r_\mathbf{c}^3}\left[2(x_0x' + y_0y') - (x'^2 + y'^2)\right]^2 + \cdots \\
& = r_c - \frac{x_0}{r_\mathbf{c}}x' - \frac{y_0}{r_\mathbf{c}}y' + \frac{1}{2 r_\mathbf{c}}x'^2 + \frac{1}{2 r_\mathbf{c}}y'^2
+ \frac{1}{8 r_\mathbf{c}^3} \left [ 4x_0^2 x'^2 + 8x_0 y_0 x' y' + 4y_0^2 y'^2
- 4x_0x'^3 - 4x_0x'y'^2 - 4y_0x'^2y' - 4y_0y'^3 + x'^4 + 2x'^2y'^2 + y'^4 \right ] + \cdots \\
& = r_c - \frac{x_0}{r_\mathbf{c}}x' - \frac{y_0}{r_\mathbf{c}}y' + \frac{1}{2 r_\mathbf{c}}x'^2 + \frac{1}{2 r_\mathbf{c}}y'^2
+ \frac{x_0^2}{2r_\mathbf{c}^3}x'^2 + \frac{x_0y_0}{r_\mathbf{c}^3}x'y' + \frac{y_0^2}{2r_\mathbf{c}^3}y'^2 - \frac{x_0}{2r_\mathbf{c}^3}x'^3 - \frac{x_0}{2r_\mathbf{c}^3}x'y'^2
- \frac{y_0}{2r_\mathbf{c}^3}x'^2y' - \frac{y_0}{2r_\mathbf{c}^3}y'^3 + \frac{1}{8r_\mathbf{c}^3}x'^4 + \frac{1}{4r_\mathbf{c}^3}x'^2y'^2 + \frac{1}{8r_\mathbf{c}^3}y'^4 + \cdots \\
& = r_c - \frac{x_0}{r_\mathbf{c}}x' - \frac{y_0}{r_\mathbf{c}}y' + \left ( \frac{1}{2 r_\mathbf{c}} + \frac{x_0^2}{2r_\mathbf{c}^3} \right )x'^2 + \left ( \frac{1}{2 r_\mathbf{c}} + \frac{y_0^2}{2r_\mathbf{c}^3} \right)y'^2
+ \frac{x_0y_0}{r_\mathbf{c}^3}x'y' - \frac{x_0}{2r_\mathbf{c}^3}x'^3 - \frac{x_0}{2r_\mathbf{c}^3}x'y'^2
- \frac{y_0}{2r_\mathbf{c}^3}x'^2y' - \frac{y_0}{2r_\mathbf{c}^3}y'^3 + \frac{1}{8r_\mathbf{c}^3}x'^4 + \frac{1}{4r_\mathbf{c}^3}x'^2y'^2 + \frac{1}{8r_\mathbf{c}^3}y'^4 + \cdots,
\end{alignat}$$
$$\begin{alignat} {2}
s & = s_\mathbf{c}\left[1 - \frac{1}{2s_\mathbf{c}^2}\left[2(xx' + yy') - (x'^2 + y'^2)\right] + \frac{1}{8s_\mathbf{c}^4}\left[2(xx' + yy') - (x'^2 + y'^2)\right]^2 + \cdots\right]\\
& = s_c - \frac{x}{s_\mathbf{c}}x' - \frac{y}{s_\mathbf{c}}y' + \left ( \frac{1}{2 s_\mathbf{c}} + \frac{x^2}{2s_\mathbf{c}^3} \right )x'^2 + \left ( \frac{1}{2 s_\mathbf{c}} + \frac{y^2}{2s_\mathbf{c}^3} \right)y'^2
+ \frac{xy}{s_\mathbf{c}^3}x'y' - \frac{x}{2s_\mathbf{c}^3}x'^3 - \frac{x}{2s_\mathbf{c}^3}x'y'^2
- \frac{y}{2s_\mathbf{c}^3}x'^2y' - \frac{y}{2s_\mathbf{c}^3}y'^3 + \frac{1}{8s_\mathbf{c}^3}x'^4 + \frac{1}{4s_\mathbf{c}^3}x'^2y'^2 + \frac{1}{8s_\mathbf{c}^3}y'^4 + \cdots.
\end{alignat}$$

The complex amplitude at P can now be expressed as
$$U(\mathbf{P}) \approx -\frac{ia \cos\beta}{\lambda r_\mathbf{c}s_\mathbf{c}} \int_{S} e^{ik(r+s)}\,dS = -\frac{i\cos\beta}{\lambda} \frac{ae^{ik(r_\mathbf{c} + s_\mathbf{c})}}{r_\mathbf{c}s_\mathbf{c}} \int_S e^{ikf(x',y')}\, dx' dy',$$
where $f\left(x', y'\right)$ includes all the terms in the expression of r + s, except for the first two constant terms $r_\mathbf{c}$ and $s_\mathbf{c}$:
$$\begin{align}
f(x',y') & = -\left(\frac{x_0}{r_\mathbf{c}} + \frac{x}{s_\mathbf{c}} \right)x' - \left(\frac{y_0}{r_\mathbf{c}} + \frac{y}{s_\mathbf{c}} \right)y'
+ \left(\frac{1}{2 r_\mathbf{c}} + \frac{x_0^2}{2r_\mathbf{c}^3} + \frac{1}{2 s_\mathbf{c}} + \frac{x^2}{2s_\mathbf{c}^3}\right)x'^2
+ \left(\frac{1}{2 r_\mathbf{c}} + \frac{y_0^2}{2r_\mathbf{c}^3} + \frac{1}{2 s_\mathbf{c}} + \frac{y^2}{2s_\mathbf{c}^3}\right)y'^2
+ \left(\frac{x_0y_0}{r_\mathbf{c}^3} + \frac{xy}{s_\mathbf{c}^3} \right)x'y'+ \cdots \\
& = c_1 x' + c_2 y' + c_3 x'^2 + c_4 y'^2 + c_5x'y' \cdots,
\end{align}$$
where the c_{i} are constants for a given problem geometry.

With paraxial approximation where $z_0 \gg x_0,y_0$ and $z \gg x,y$, terms with 2nd or higher powers of $\frac{x_0}{r_\mathbf{c}}$, $\frac{y_0}{r_\mathbf{c}}$, $\frac{x}{s_\mathbf{c}}$, $\frac{y}{s_\mathbf{c}}$, and terms with ratios of cross terms in $x_0, y_0, x, y$ to cross terms in $r_\mathbf{c}, s_\mathbf{c}$, are neglected, so $f\left(x', y'\right)$ becomes,
$$\begin{align}
f(x',y') & \approx -\left(\frac{x_0}{r_\mathbf{c}} + \frac{x}{s_\mathbf{c}} \right)x' - \left(\frac{y_0}{r_\mathbf{c}} + \frac{y}{s_\mathbf{c}} \right)y'
+ \left(\frac{1}{2 r_\mathbf{c}} + \frac{1}{2 s_\mathbf{c}} \right)x'^2
+ \left(\frac{1}{2 r_\mathbf{c}} + \frac{1}{2 s_\mathbf{c}} \right)y'^2 + \cdots \\
& = c_1 x' + c_2 y' + c_3 x'^2 + c_4 y'^2 \cdots.
\end{align}$$

=== Fraunhofer diffraction ===
On top of the paraxial approximation for P_{0} and P made above, if all the terms in $f\left(x', y'\right)$ can be neglected except for the 1st order terms in x' and y' because of $r_\mathbf{c} \gg x',y'$ and $s_\mathbf{c} \gg x',y'$, we have the Fraunhofer diffraction equation. If the direction cosines of vectors $\mathbf{r_c}$ (the vector from Q to P_{0}) and $\mathbf{s_c}$ (the vector from Q to P) in the given Cartesian coordinate system are
$$\begin{align}
l_0 &= x_0/r_\mathbf{c}, \\
m_0 &= y_0/r_\mathbf{c}, \\
l &= x/s_\mathbf{c}, \\
m &= y/s_\mathbf{c}.
\end{align}$$

The Fraunhofer diffraction equation is then
$$U(\mathbf{P}) \approx -\frac{i\cos\beta}{\lambda} \frac{ae^{ik(r_\mathbf{c} + s_\mathbf{c})}}{r_\mathbf{c}s_\mathbf{c}} \int_S e^{-ik[(l_0 + l)x' + (m_0 + m)y']}\, dx' dy'.$$
This can also be written in the form
$$U(\mathbf{P}) \approx -\frac{i\cos\beta}{\lambda} \frac{ae^{ik(r_\mathbf{c} + s_\mathbf{c})}}{r_\mathbf{c}s_\mathbf{c}} \int_S e^{-i(\mathbf k - \mathbf k_0) \cdot \mathbf r'}\, dx'dy'$$
where $\mathbf{r}' = (x',y',0)$ is the position vector to a point in the aperture, and $\mathbf{k}_0$ and $\mathbf{k}$ are the wave vectors of the waves traveling from P_{0} to the coordinate system origin (located in the aperture) and from the origin to P respectively; $\mathbf{k}_0 = k \left(- \hat{\mathbf{r}}_\mathbf{c} \right) = - k \hat{\mathbf{r}}_\mathbf{c}$ and $\mathbf{k} = k\hat{\mathbf{s}}_\mathbf{c}$.).

If the spherical wave point source is replaced by an extended source giving a spherical wave-like wave $U(\mathbf{r}') = a(r) e^{ikr}$, then, as before, the Fraunhofer diffraction equation is:
$$\begin{align}
U(\mathbf{P}) & \approx -\frac{i \cos\beta e^{ik(r_\mathbf{c} + s_\mathbf{c})}}{\lambda s_\mathbf{c}} \int_S a(r) e^{-i(\mathbf k - \mathbf k_0) \cdot \mathbf r'}\, dx'dy' \\
& = -\frac{i \cos\beta e^{ik(r_\mathbf{c} + s_\mathbf{c})}}{\lambda s_\mathbf{c}} \int_S a(r) e^{-i\Delta\mathbf k \cdot \mathbf r'}\, dx'dy' \\
& = -\frac{i \cos\beta e^{ik(r_\mathbf{c} + s_\mathbf{c})}}{\lambda s_\mathbf{c}} \int_S a(r) e^{-i(\Delta\mathbf k_{x}x' + \Delta\mathbf k_{y}y')}\, dx'dy'
\end{align}$$
where $\Delta\mathbf k = \mathbf k - \mathbf k_0 = \Delta\mathbf k_x \hat{\mathbf x} + \Delta\mathbf k_y \hat{\mathbf y} + \Delta\mathbf k_z \hat{\mathbf z}$. This expression tells that the Fraunhofer diffraction is proportional to the Fourier transform of the complex wave magnitude $a(\mathbf{r}') = a(r)$ in the aperture.

In deriving the Fraunhofer diffraction equation, in addition to the assumptions made during the derivation of the Kirchhoff's diffraction formula, it is assumed that (Note: The below assumptions imply the assumption made above: the triangle P_{0}QP is stretched along the edge P_{0}P (so that this edge is approximately parallel to other edges P_{0}Q and QP),)

- r (the length of P_{0}Q) and s (the length of QP) are significantly greater than the size of the aperture,
- the paraxial approximation for P_{0} and P is made.

=== Fresnel diffraction ===
On top of the paraxial approximation for P_{0} and P made above, if all the terms in $f\left(x', y'\right)$ can be neglected except for the first and second order terms in x' and y' because of $r_\mathbf{c}$ and $s_\mathbf{c}$ being moderately greater than $x'$ and $y'$, the equation becomes the Fresnel diffraction equation.

In deriving the Fresnel diffraction equation, in addition to the assumptions made during the derivation of the Kirchhoff's diffraction formula, it is assumed that

- r (the length of P_{0}Q) and s (the length of QP) are moderately greater than the size of the aperture,
- the paraxial approximation for P_{0} and P is made.
