= Fresnel lens =

Compact composite lens

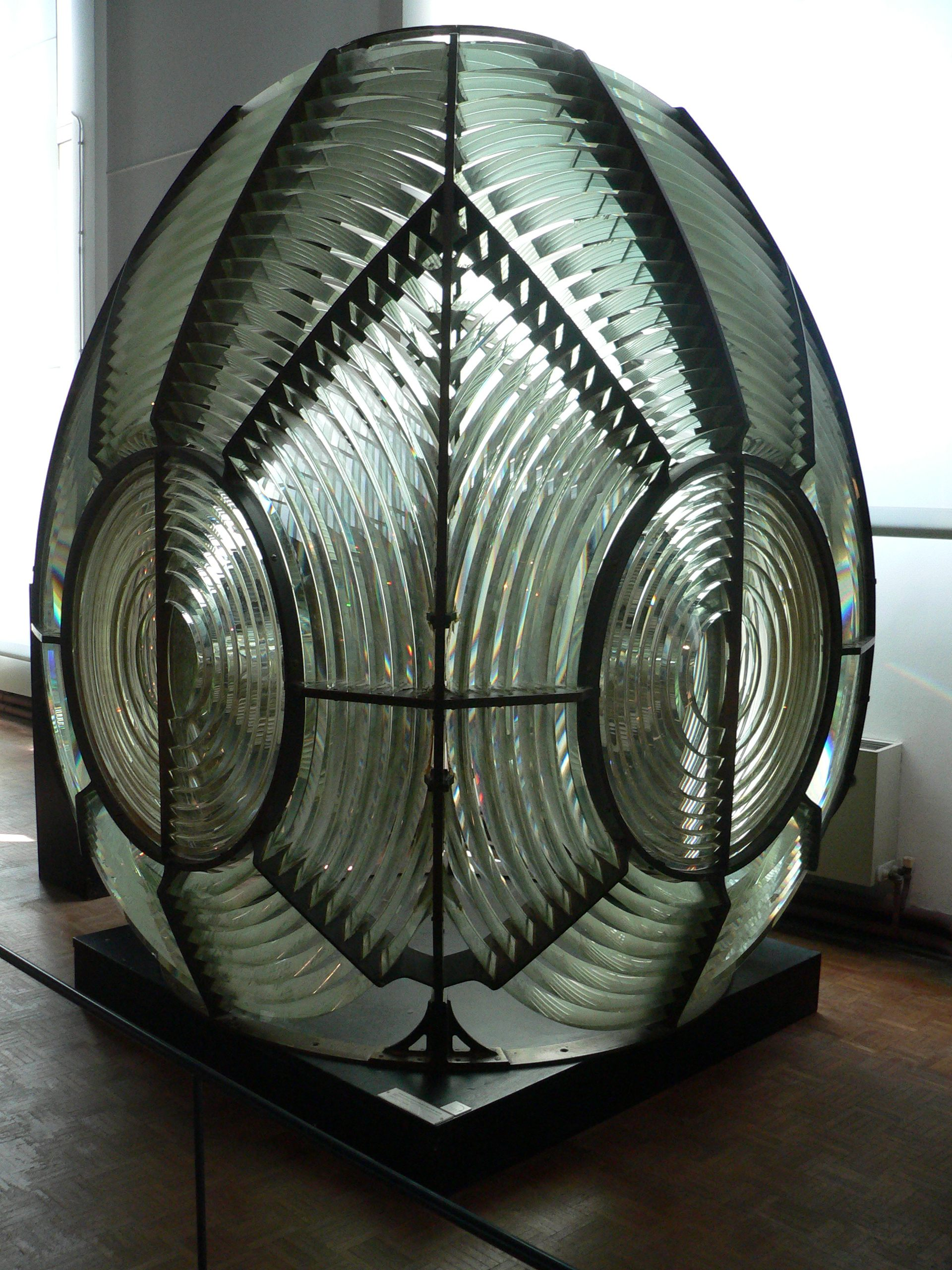
First-order rotating catadioptric Fresnel lens, dated 1870, displayed at the Musée national de la Marine, Paris. In this case the dioptric prisms (inside the bronze rings) and catadioptric prisms (outside) are arranged to concentrate the light from the central lamp into four revolving beams, seen by sailors as four flashes per revolution. The assembly stands 2.54 metres (8.3 ft) tall and weighs about 1.5 tonnes (3,300 lb).

A Fresnel lens (/ˈfreɪnɛl, -nəl/ FRAY-nel, -nəl; /ˈfrɛnɛl, -əl/ FREN-el, -əl; or /freɪˈnɛl/ fray-NEL) is a type of composite compact lens which reduces the amount of material required compared to a conventional lens by dividing the lens into a set of concentric annular sections.

The simpler dioptric (purely refractive) form of the lens was first proposed by Georges-Louis Leclerc, Comte de Buffon, and independently reinvented by the French physicist Augustin-Jean Fresnel (1788–1827) for use in lighthouses. The catadioptric (combining refraction and reflection) form of the lens, entirely invented by Fresnel, has outer prismatic elements that use total internal reflection as well as refraction to capture more oblique light from the light source and add it to the beam, making it visible at greater distances.

The design allows the construction of lenses of large aperture and short focal length without the mass and volume of material that would be required by a lens of conventional design. A Fresnel lens can be made much thinner than a comparable conventional lens, in some cases taking the form of a flat sheet.

Because of its use in lighthouses, it has been called "the invention that saved a million ships".

== History ==
=== Forerunners ===
The first person to focus a lighthouse beam using a lens was the London glass-cutter Thomas Rogers, who proposed the idea to Trinity House in 1788. The first Rogers lenses, 53 cm (21 inches) in diameter and 14 cm (5.5 inches) thick at the center, were installed at the Old Lower Lighthouse at Portland Bill in 1789. Behind each lamp was a back-coated spherical glass mirror, which reflected rear radiation back through the lamp and into the lens. Further samples were installed at Howth Baily, North Foreland, and at least four other locations by 1804. But much of the light was wasted by absorption in the glass.

In 1748, Georges-Louis Leclerc, Comte de Buffon was the first to replace a convex lens with a series of concentric annular prisms, ground as steps in a single piece of glass, to reduce weight and absorption. In 1790 (although secondary sources give the date as 1773 or 1788), the Marquis de Condorcet suggested that it would be easier to make the annular sections separately and assemble them on a frame; but even that was impractical at the time. These designs were intended not for lighthouses, but for burning glasses. David Brewster, however, proposed a system similar to Condorcet's in 1811, and by 1820 was advocating its use in British lighthouses.

=== Publication and refinement ===
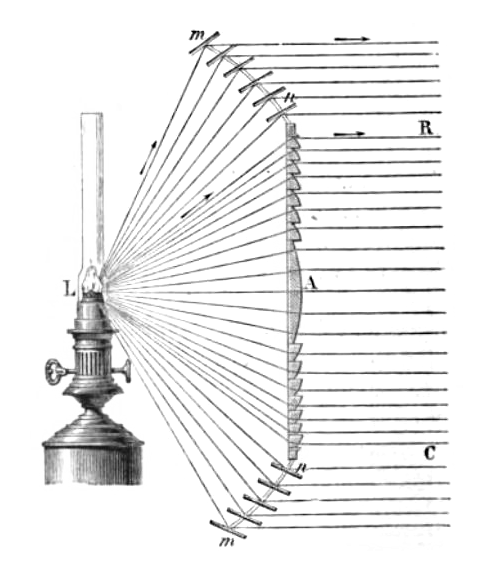
Cross-section of a first-generation Fresnel lighthouse lens, with sloping mirrors m, n above and below the refractive panel RC (with central segment A). The design was later improved by replacing the mirrors with reflective prisms to reduce losses. If the cross-section in every vertical plane through the lamp L is the same (cylindrical symmetry), the light is spread evenly around the horizon.

The French Commission des Phares (Commission of Lighthouses) was established by Napoleon in 1811, and placed under the authority of French physicist Augustin-Jean Fresnel's employer, the Corps of Bridges and Roads. As the members of the commission were otherwise occupied, it achieved little in its early years. However, on 21 June 1819—three months after winning the physics Grand Prix of the Academy of Sciences for his celebrated memoir on diffraction—Fresnel was "temporarily" seconded to the commission on the recommendation of François Arago (a member since 1813), to review possible improvements in lighthouse illumination.

By the end of August 1819, unaware of the Buffon-Condorcet-Brewster proposal, Fresnel made his first presentation to the commission, recommending what he called lentilles à échelons ('lenses by steps') to replace the reflectors then in use, which reflected only about half of the incident light. Another report by Fresnel, dated 29 August 1819 (Fresnel, 1866–70, vol. 3, pp. 15–21), concerns tests on reflectors, and does not mention stepped lenses except in an unrelated sketch on the last page of the manuscript. The minutes of the meetings of the Commission go back only to 1824, when Fresnel himself took over as Secretary. Thus the exact date on which Fresnel formally recommended lentilles à échelons is unknown. Much to Fresnel's embarrassment, one of the assembled commissioners, Jacques Charles, recalled Buffon's suggestion. However, whereas Buffon's version was biconvex and in one piece, Fresnel's was plano-convex and made of multiple prisms for easier construction.

With an official budget of 500 francs, Fresnel approached three manufacturers. The third, François Soleil, found a way to remove defects by reheating and remolding the glass. Arago assisted Fresnel with the design of a modified Argand lamp with concentric wicks (a concept that Fresnel attributed to Count Rumford), and accidentally discovered that fish glue was heat-resistant, making it suitable for use in the lens. The prototype, finished in March 1820, had a square lens panel 55 cm (22 inches) on a side, containing 97 polygonal (not annular) prisms—and so impressed the Commission that Fresnel was asked for a full eight-panel version. This model, completed a year later in spite of insufficient funding, had panels 76 cm (30 inches) square. In a public spectacle on the evening of 13 April 1821, it was demonstrated by comparison with the most recent reflectors, which it suddenly rendered obsolete.

Soon after this demonstration, Fresnel published the idea that light, including apparently unpolarized light, consists exclusively of transverse waves, and went on to consider the implications for double refraction and partial reflection.

Fresnel acknowledged the British lenses and Buffon's invention in a memoir read on 29 July 1822 and printed in the same year. The date of that memoir may be the source of the claim that Fresnel's lighthouse advocacy began two years later than Brewster's; but the text makes it clear that Fresnel's involvement began no later than 1819.

Fresnel's next lens was a rotating apparatus with eight "bull's-eye" panels, made in annular arcs by Saint-Gobain, giving eight rotating beams—to be seen by mariners as a periodic flash. Above and behind each main panel was a smaller, sloping bull's-eye panel of trapezoidal outline with trapezoidal elements. This refracted the light to a sloping plane mirror, which then reflected it horizontally, 7 degrees ahead of the main beam, increasing the duration of the flash. Below the main panels were 128 small mirrors arranged in four rings, stacked like the slats of a louver or Venetian blind. Each ring, shaped like a frustum of a cone, reflected the light to the horizon, giving a fainter steady light between the flashes. The official test, conducted on the unfinished Arc de Triomphe on 20 August 1822, was witnessed by the Commission—and by Louis XVIII and his entourage—from 32 kilometres (20 mi) away. The apparatus was stored at Bordeaux for the winter, and then reassembled at Cordouan Lighthouse under Fresnel's supervision—in part by Fresnel's own hands. On 25 July 1823, the world's first lighthouse Fresnel lens was lit. As expected, the light was visible to the horizon, more than 32 kilometres (20 mi) out.

The day before the test of the Cordouan lens in Paris, a committee of the Academy of Sciences reported on Fresnel's memoir and supplements on double refraction—which, although less well known to modern readers than his earlier work on diffraction, struck a more decisive blow for the wave theory of light. Between the test and the reassembly at Cordouan, Fresnel submitted his papers on photoelasticity (16 September 1822), elliptical and circular polarization and optical rotation (9 December), and partial reflection and total internal reflection (7 January 1823), essentially completing his reconstruction of physical optics on the transverse wave hypothesis. Shortly after the Cordouan lens was lit, Fresnel started coughing up blood.

In May 1824, Fresnel was promoted to Secretary of the Commission des Phares, becoming the first member of that body to draw a salary, albeit in the concurrent role of Engineer-in-Chief. Late that year, being increasingly ill, he curtailed his fundamental research and resigned his seasonal job as an examiner at the École Polytechnique, in order to save his remaining time and energy for his lighthouse work.

In the same year he designed the first fixed lens—for spreading light evenly around the horizon while minimizing waste above or below. Ideally the curved refracting surfaces would be segments of toroids about a common vertical axis, so that the dioptric panel would look like a cylindrical drum. If this was supplemented by reflecting (catoptric) rings above and below the refracting (dioptric) parts, the entire apparatus would look like a beehive. The second Fresnel lens to enter service was indeed a fixed lens, of third order, installed at Dunkirk by 1 February 1825. However, due to the difficulty of fabricating large toroidal prisms, this apparatus had a 16-sided polygonal plan.

In 1825 Fresnel extended his fixed-lens design by adding a rotating array outside the fixed array. Each panel of the rotating array was to refract part of the fixed light from a horizontal fan into a narrow beam.

Also in 1825, Fresnel unveiled the Carte des Phares ('lighthouse map'), calling for a system of 51 lighthouses plus smaller harbor lights, in a hierarchy of lens sizes called "orders" (the first being the largest), with different characteristics to facilitate recognition: a constant light (from a fixed lens), one flash per minute (from a rotating lens with eight panels), and two per minute (16 panels).

In late 1825, to reduce the loss of light in the reflecting elements, Fresnel proposed to replace each mirror with a catadioptric prism, through which the light would travel by refraction through the first surface, then total internal reflection off the second surface, then refraction through the third surface. The result was the lighthouse lens as we now know it. In 1826 he assembled a small model for use on the Canal Saint-Martin, but he did not live to see a full-sized version: he died on 14 July 1827, at the age of 39.

=== After Fresnel ===
The first stage of the development of lighthouse lenses after the death of Augustin Fresnel consisted in the implementation of his designs. This was driven in part by his younger brother Léonor—who, like Augustin, was trained as a civil engineer but, unlike Augustin, had a strong aptitude for management. Léonor entered the service of the Lighthouse Commission in 1825, and went on to succeed Augustin as Secretary.

The first fixed lens to be constructed with toroidal prisms was a first-order apparatus designed by the Scottish engineer Alan Stevenson under the guidance of Léonor Fresnel, and fabricated by Isaac Cookson & Co. using French glass; it entered service at the Isle of May, Scotland, on 22 September 1836. The first large catadioptric lenses were made in 1842 for the lighthouses at Gravelines and Île Vierge, France; these were fixed third-order lenses whose catadioptric rings (made in segments) were one metre in diameter. Stevenson's first-order Skerryvore lens, lit in 1844, was only partly catadioptric; it was similar to the Cordouan lens except that the lower slats were replaced by French-made catadioptric prisms, while mirrors were retained at the top. The first fully catadioptric first-order lens, installed at Pointe d'Ailly in 1852, also gave eight rotating beams plus a fixed light at the bottom; but its top section had eight catadioptric panels focusing the light about 4 degrees ahead of the main beams, in order to lengthen the flashes. The first fully catadioptric lens with purely revolving beams—also of first order—was installed at Saint-Clément-des-Baleines in 1854, and marked the completion of Augustin Fresnel's original Carte des Phares.

Thomas Stevenson (younger brother of Alan) went a step beyond Fresnel with his "holophotal" lens, which focused the light radiated by the lamp in nearly all directions, forward or backward, into a single beam. The first version, described in 1849, consisted of a standard Fresnel bull's-eye lens, a paraboloidal reflector, and a rear hemispherical reflector (functionally equivalent to the Rogers mirror of 60 years earlier, except that it subtended a whole hemisphere). Light radiated into the forward hemisphere but missing the bull's-eye lens was deflected by the paraboloid into a parallel beam surrounding the bull's-eye lens, while light radiated into the backward hemisphere was reflected back through the lamp by the spherical reflector (as in Rogers' arrangement), to be collected by the forward components. The first unit was installed at North Harbour, Peterhead, in August 1849. Stevenson called this version a "catadioptric holophote", although each of its elements was either purely reflective or purely refractive. In the second version of the holophote concept, the bull's-eye lens and paraboloidal reflector were replaced by a catadioptric Fresnel lens—as conceived by Fresnel, but expanded to cover the whole forward hemisphere. The third version, which Stevenson confusingly called a "dioptric holophote", was more innovative: it retained the catadioptric Fresnel lens for the front hemisphere, but replaced the rear hemispherical reflector with a hemispherical array of annular prisms, each of which used two total internal reflections to turn light diverging from the center of the hemisphere back toward the center. The result was an all-glass holophote, with no losses from metallic reflections.

James Timmins Chance modified Thomas Stevenson's all-glass holophotal design by arranging the double-reflecting prisms about a vertical axis. The prototype was shown at the 1862 International Exhibition in London. Later, to ease manufacturing, Chance divided the prisms into segments, and arranged them in a cylindrical form while retaining the property of reflecting light from a single point back to that point. Reflectors of this form, paradoxically called "dioptric mirrors", proved particularly useful for returning light from the landward side of the lamp to the seaward side.

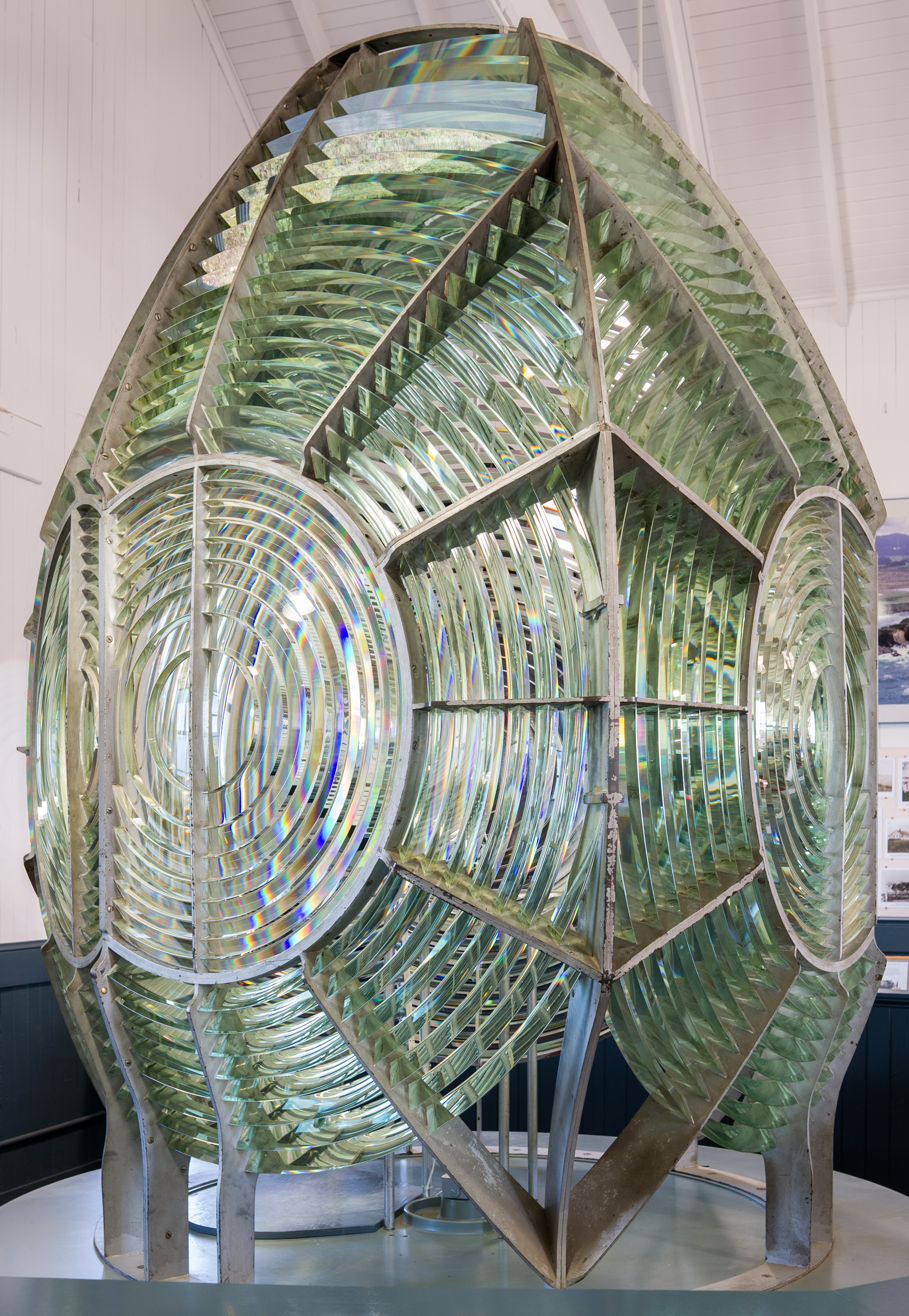
First-order group-flashing Fresnel lens, on display at the Point Arena Lighthouse Museum, Point Arena Lighthouse, Mendocino County, California. The three dioptric panels (inside the brass rings) and three catadioptric panels (outside) are partly split in two, giving three double-flashes per rotation.

As lighthouses proliferated, they became harder to distinguish from each other, leading to the use of colored filters, which wasted light. In 1884, John Hopkinson eliminated the need for filters by inventing the "group-flashing" lens, in which the dioptric and/or the catadioptric panels were split so as to give multiple flashes—allowing lighthouses to be identified not only by frequency of flashes, but also by multiplicity of flashes. Double-flashing lenses were installed at Tampico (Mexico) and Little Basses (Sri Lanka) in 1875, and a triple-flashing lens at Casquets Lighthouse (Channel Islands) in 1876. The example shown (right) is the double-flashing lens of the Point Arena Light, which was in service from 1908 to 1977.

The development of hyper-radial lenses was driven in part by the need for larger light sources, such as gas lights with multiple jets, which required a longer focal length for a given beam-width, hence a larger lens to collect a given fraction of the generated light. The first hyper-radial lens was built for the Stevensons in 1885 by F. Barbier & Cie of France, and tested at South Foreland Lighthouse with various light sources. Chance Brothers (Hopkinson's employers) then began constructing hyper-radials, installing their first at Bishop Rock Lighthouse in 1887. In the same year, Barbier installed a hyper-radial at Tory Island. But only about 30 hyper-radials went into service before the development of more compact bright lamps rendered such large optics unnecessary (see Hyperradiant Fresnel lens).

Production of one-piece stepped dioptric lenses—roughly as envisaged by Buffon—became feasible in 1852, when John L. Gilliland of the Brooklyn Flint-Glass Company patented a method of making lenses from pressed and molded glass. The company made small bull's-eye lenses for use on railroads, steamboats, and docks; such lenses were common in the United States by the 1870s. In 1858 the company produced "a very small number of pressed flint-glass sixth-order lenses" for use in lighthouses—the first Fresnel lighthouse lenses made in America. By the 1950s, the substitution of plastic for glass made it economic to use Fresnel lenses as condensers in overhead projectors.

Presently, large-scale glass Fresnel lenses have become a rarity in lighthouses around the world as modern optical systems such as LEDs (sometimes placed inside original lenses), the VRB-25, and the DCB-224 gradually replace them. These newer systems are more materially and economically efficient. Some lighthouses, such as the St. Simons Island Light, retain their original lenses, while others like the Point Isabel Light are outfitted with custom-built replicas made with acrylic prisms rather than glass. Existing Fresnel lenses that have been damaged or fallen into a state of disrepair have also been partially reconstructed with replica parts, including the rotating clockwork mechanisms. In the Southern United States, original lighthouse lenses are especially rare due to having been stolen, vandalized, damaged, or otherwise uninstalled and placed in storage during the Union blockade in the American Civil War. As many as 164 lighthouses were destroyed or rendered inoperative during the conflict. Reproduction Fresnel lenses have been constructed for films such as The Lighthouse (2019) and Slumberland (2022).

== Design ==
1: Cross-section of Buffon/Fresnel lens. 2: Cross-section of conventional plano-convex lens of equivalent power. (Buffon's version was biconvex.)

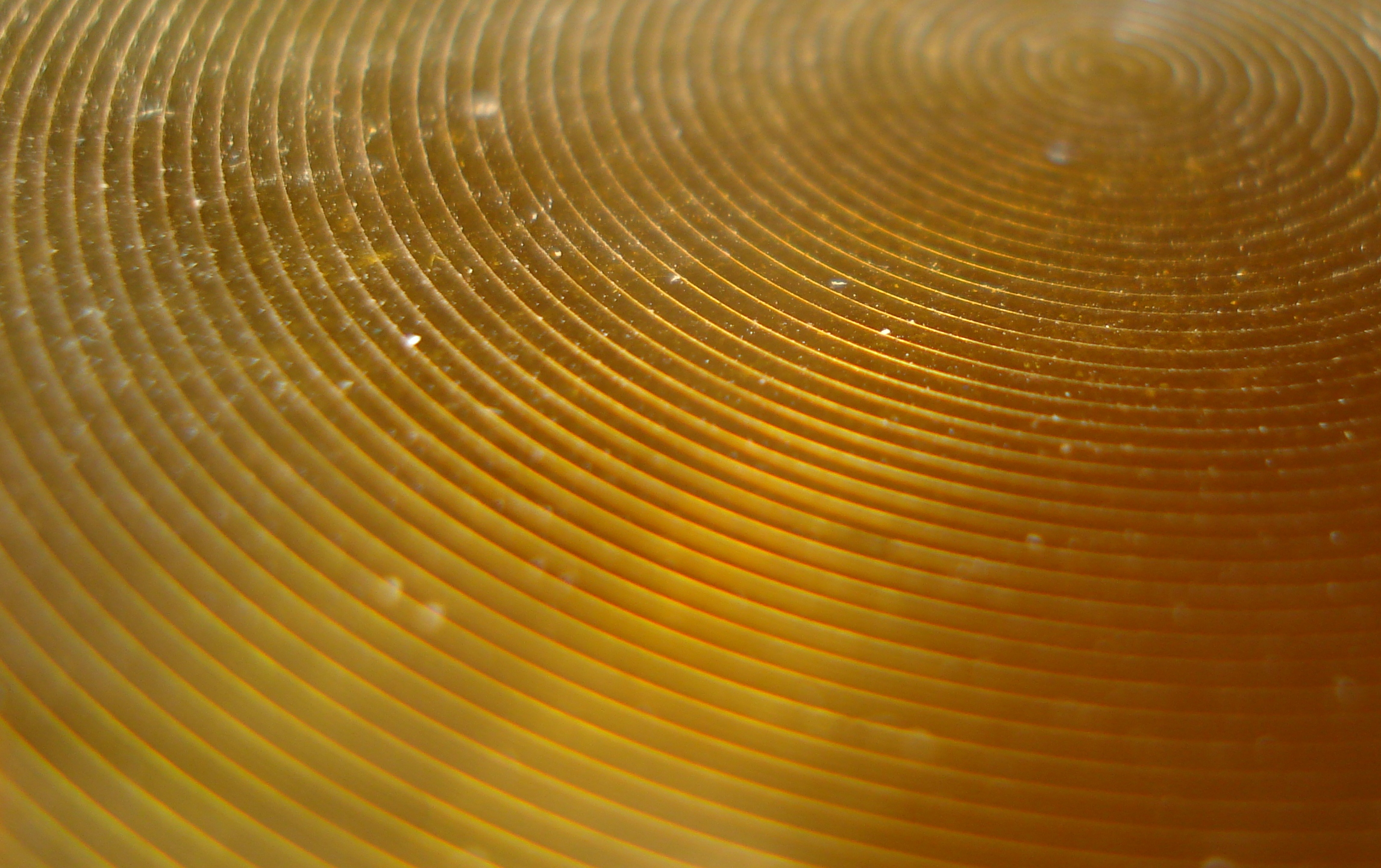
Close-up view of a flat Fresnel lens shows concentric circles on the surface.

The Fresnel lens reduces the amount of material required compared to a conventional lens by dividing the lens into a set of concentric annular sections. An ideal Fresnel lens would have an infinite number of sections. In each section, the overall thickness is decreased compared to an equivalent simple lens. This effectively divides the continuous surface of a standard lens into a set of surfaces of the same curvature, with stepwise discontinuities between them.

In some lenses, the curved surfaces are replaced with flat surfaces, with a different angle in each section. Such a lens can be regarded as an array of prisms arranged in a circular fashion with steeper prisms on the edges and a flat or slightly convex center. In the first (and largest) Fresnel lenses, each section was actually a separate prism. 'Single-piece' Fresnel lenses were later produced, being used for automobile headlamps, brake, parking, and turn signal lenses, and so on. In modern times, computer-controlled milling equipment (CNC) or 3D printers might be used to manufacture more complex lenses.

Fresnel lens design allows a substantial reduction in thickness (and thus mass and volume of material) at the expense of reducing the imaging quality of the lens, which is why precise imaging applications such as photography usually still use larger conventional lenses.

Fresnel lenses are usually made of glass or plastic; their size varies from large (old historical lighthouses, meter size) to medium (book-reading aids, OHP viewgraph projectors) to small (TLR/SLR camera screens, micro-optics). In many cases they are very thin and flat, almost flexible, with thicknesses in the 1 to 5 mm (1/32 to 3/16 in) range.

Most modern Fresnel lenses consist only of refractive elements. Lighthouse lenses, however, tend to include both refracting and reflecting elements, the latter being outside the metal rings seen in the photographs. While the inner elements are sections of refractive lenses, the outer elements are reflecting prisms, each of which performs two refractions and one total internal reflection, avoiding the light loss that occurs in reflection from a silvered mirror.

== Lighthouse lens sizes ==
Description of lens orders, from Block Island Southeast Light, Rhode Island

Walking around a fresnel lens on display in Chiba, Japan

Fresnel designed six sizes of lighthouse lenses, divided into four orders based on their size and focal length. The 3rd and 4th orders were sub-divided into "large" and "small". In modern use, the orders are classified as first through sixth order. An intermediate size between third and fourth order was added later, as well as sizes above first order and below sixth.

A first-order lens has a focal length of 920 mm (36 1/4 in) and stands about 2.59 m (8 ft 6 in) high, and 1.8 m (6 ft) wide. The smallest (sixth) order has a focal length of 150 mm (6 in) and a height of 433 mm (17 1/16 in).

The largest Fresnel lenses are called hyperradiant (or hyper-radial). One such lens was on hand when it was decided to build and outfit the Makapuu Point Light in Hawaii. Rather than order a new lens, the huge optic construction, 3.7 metres (12 ft) tall and with over a thousand prisms, was used there.

Lighthouse lens orders
Modern order	Fresnel order	Focal length (mm)	Height (m)		First installed	Application
Hyper-radial		1330	3	.76	1887	Major "landfall" lighthouses
Mesoradial		1125	3	.20	1909	Two Brazilian lighthouses
1st	1st	920	2	.59	1823	Large seacoast lights
2nd	2nd	700–750	2	.07		Great Lakes lighthouses, seacoasts, islands, sounds
3rd	3rd (large)	500	1	.58	1825	Seacoast sounds, river entry, bays, channels, range lights
3 1/2		375	1	.09		
4th	3rd (small)	250	0	.722		Shoals, reefs, harbor lights, islands in rivers and harbors
5th	4th (large)	187.5	0	.541		Breakwaters, river and channel lights, Small islands in sounds
6th	4th (small)	150	0	.433		Pier and breakwater lights in harbors
7th		100–140	0	.165		Used in Scotland and Canada
8th		70–75	0	.0826		Used in Scotland and Canada

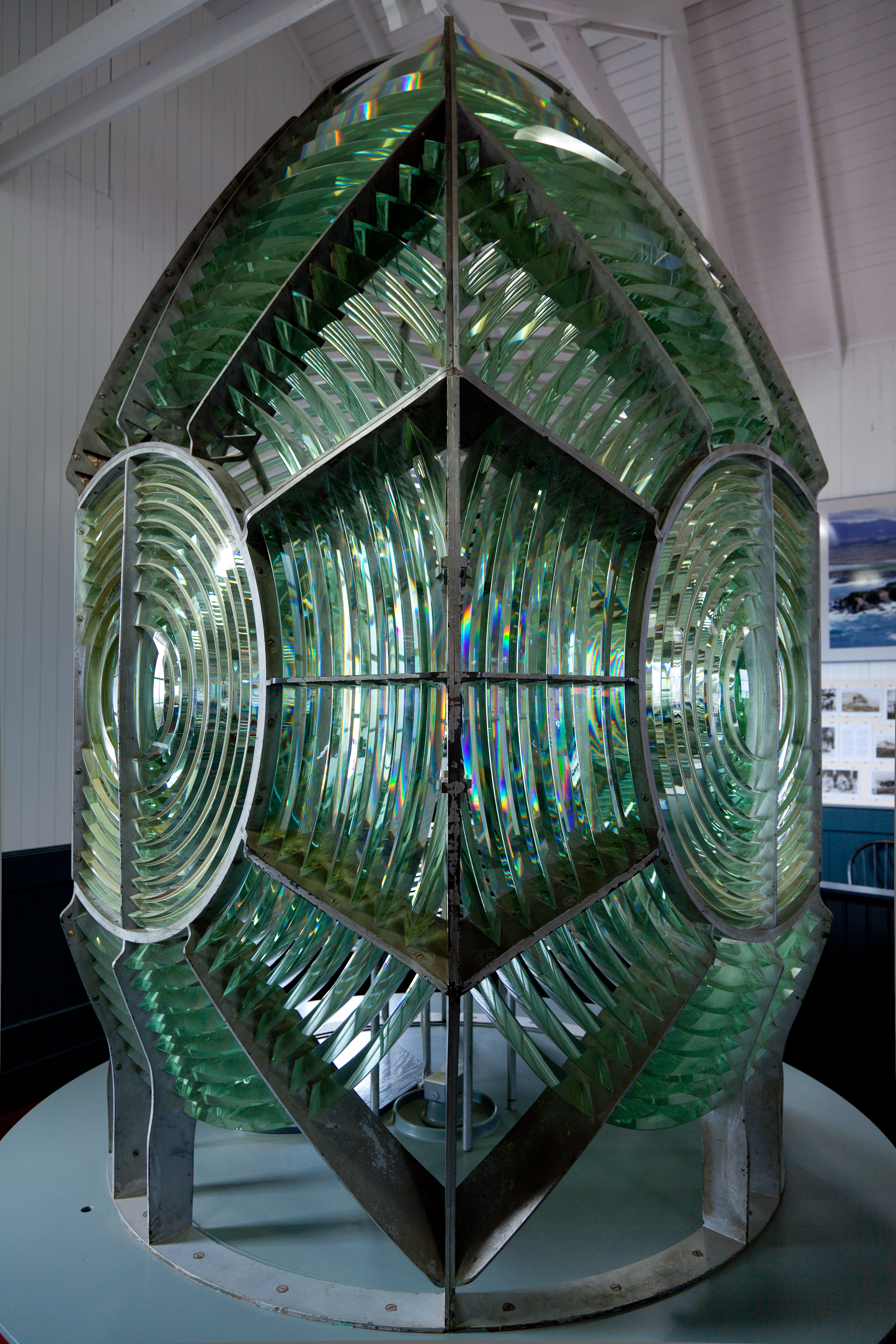
First-order lens

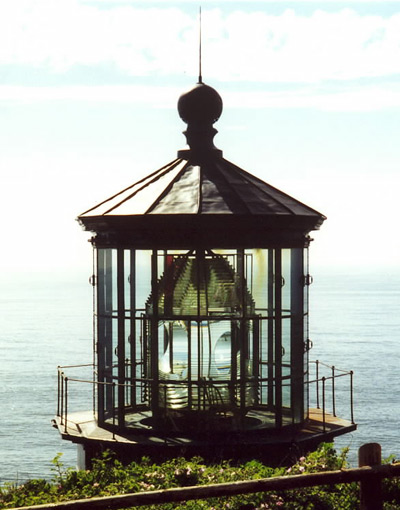
First-order lens (Cape Meares Lighthouse)

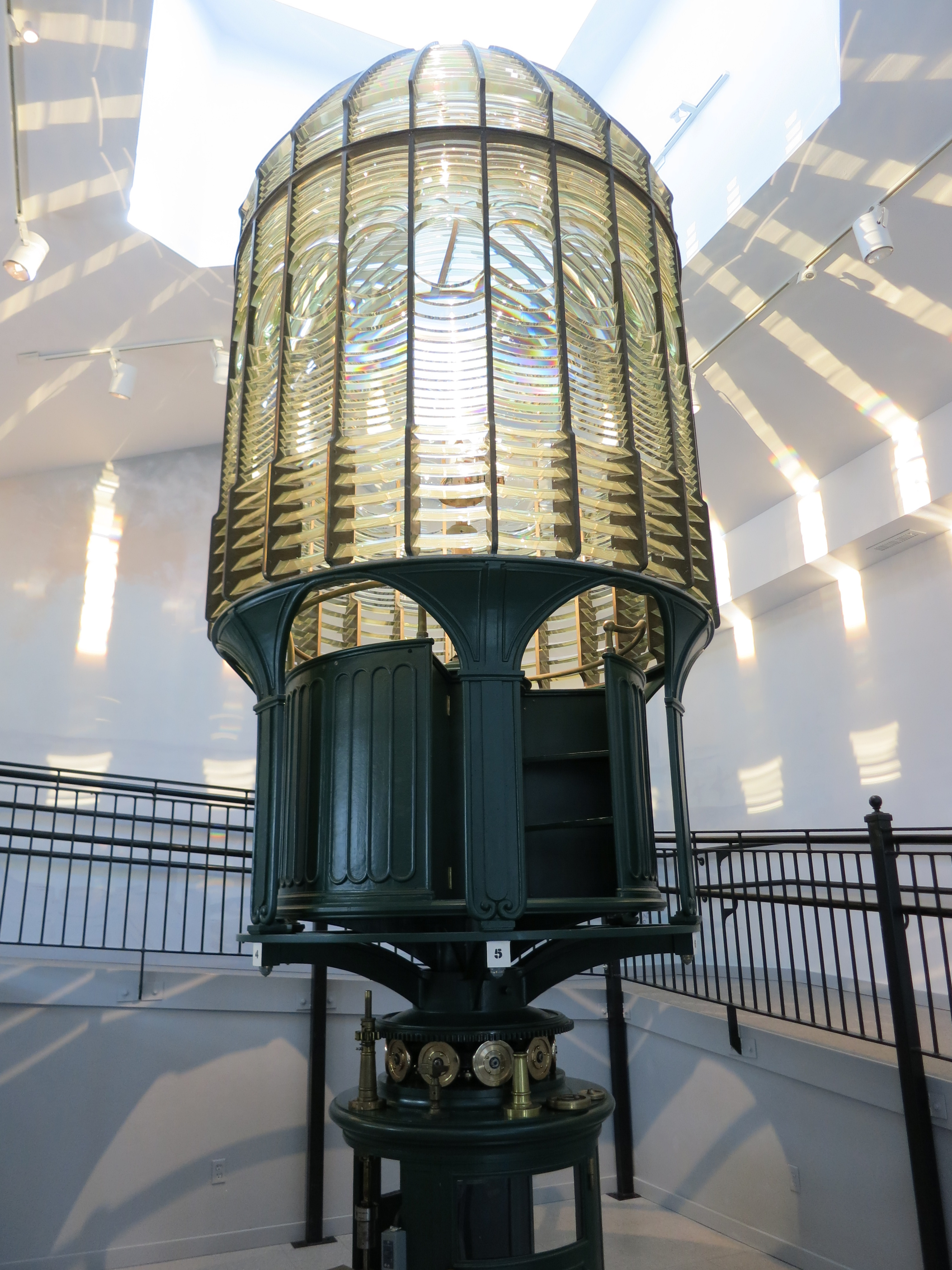
First-order lens from Destruction Island WA, built in France 1888. Currently at Westport Maritime Museum.

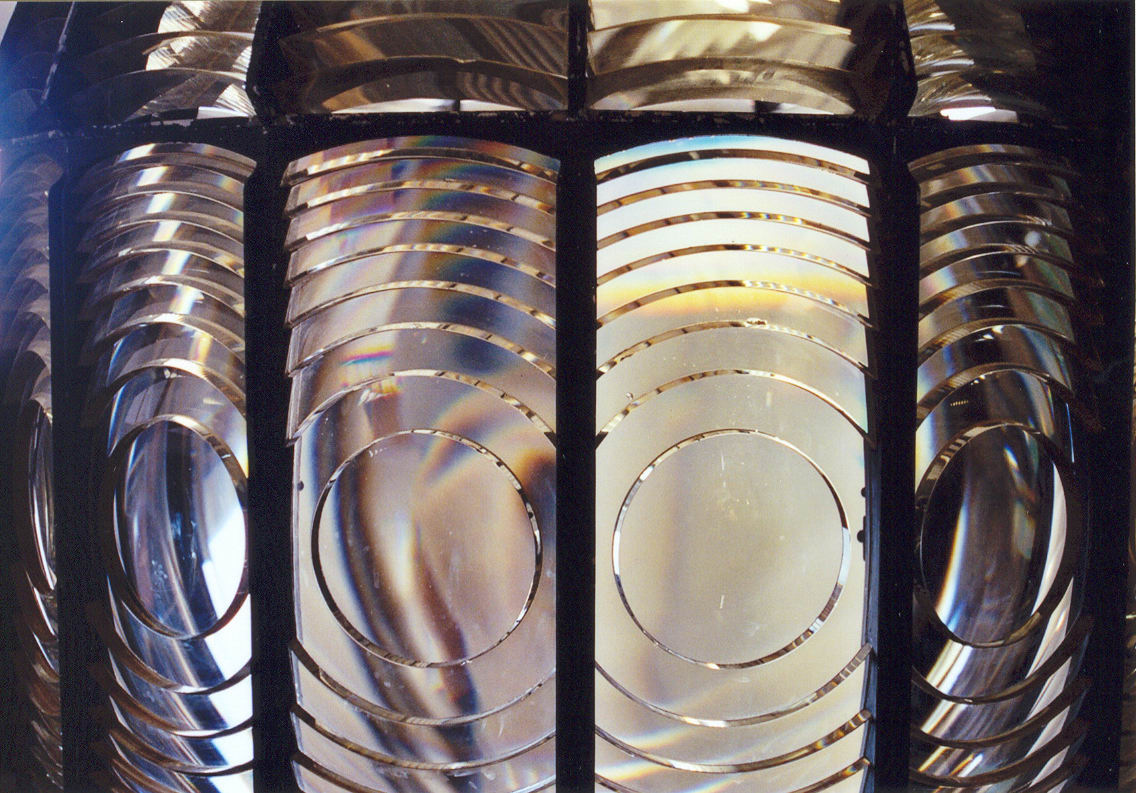
Close-up of a second-order lens

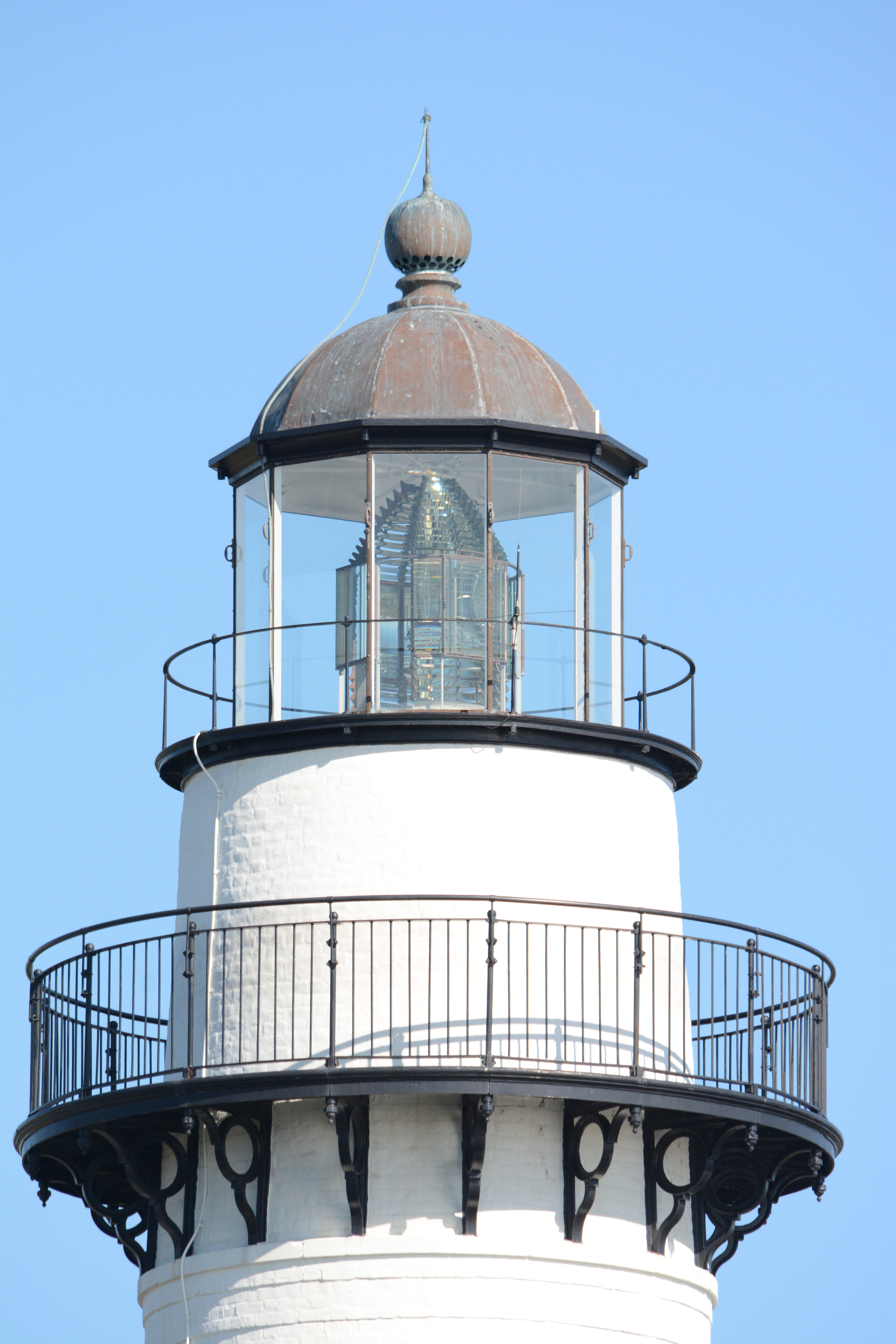
Third-order lens (St. Simons Island Light)

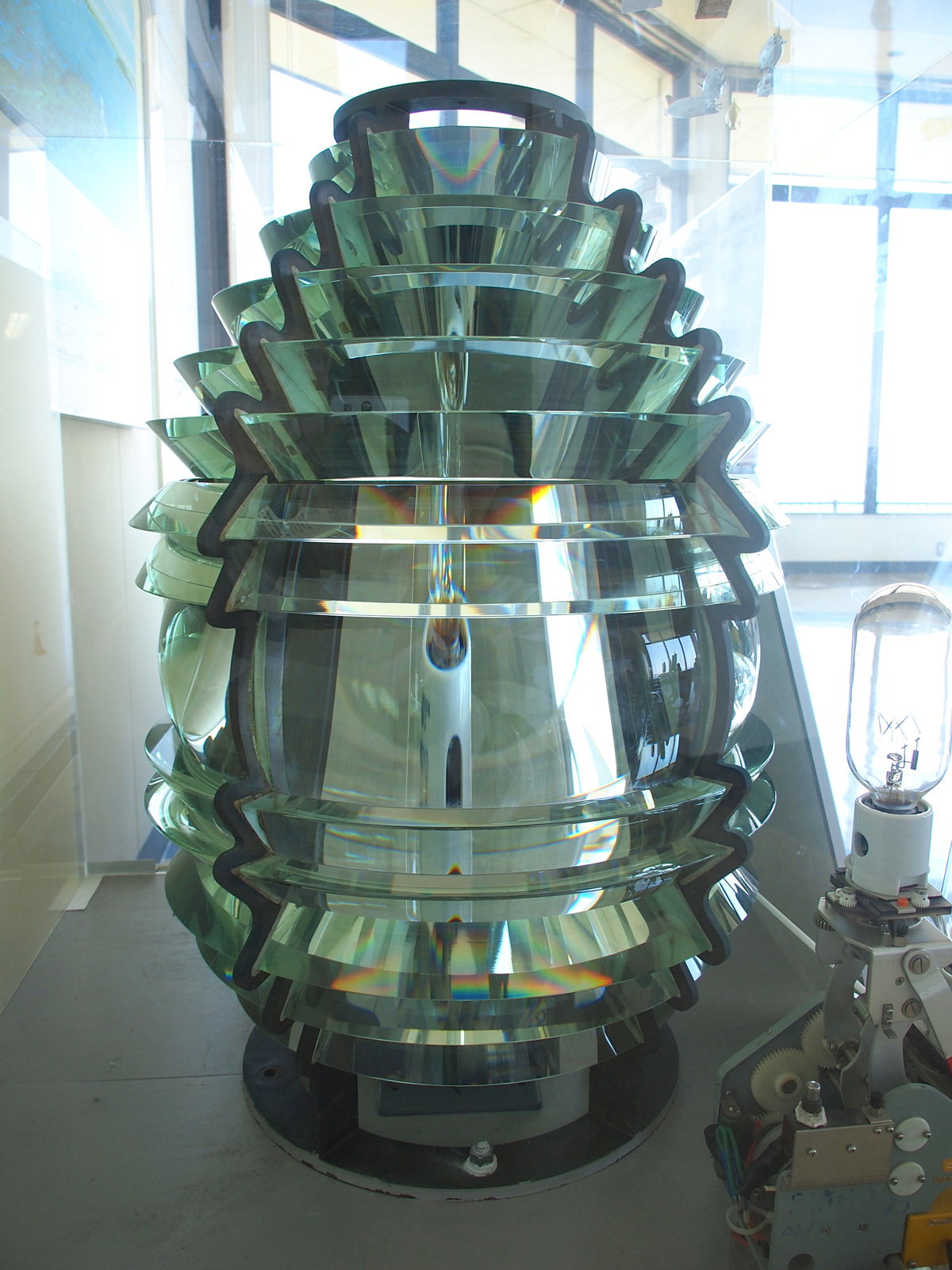
Fourth-order lens (Sekizaki Lighthouse, Oita, Japan)

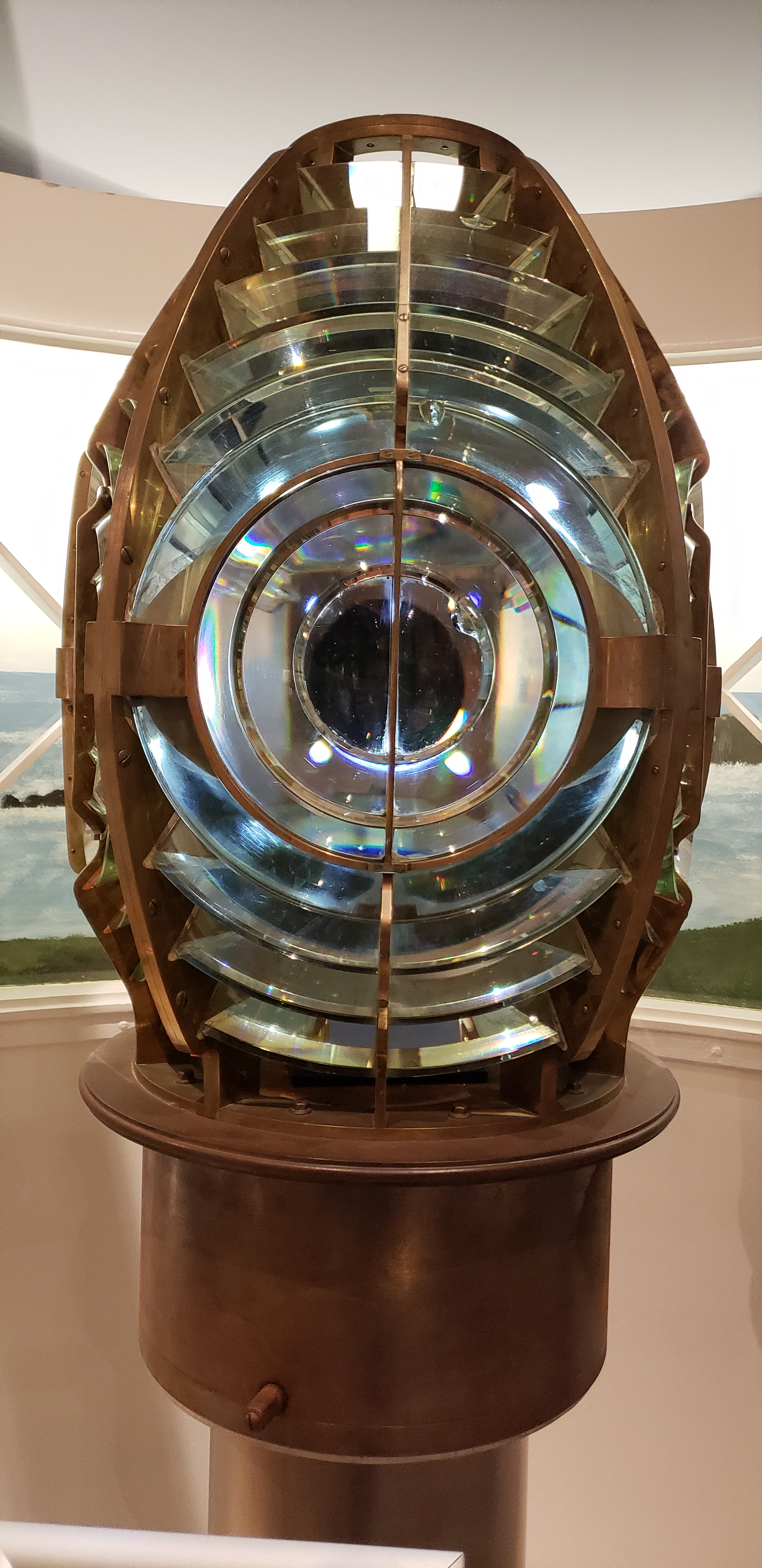
Fourth order lens from Cape Arago Lighthouse. Currently at Coos History Museum.

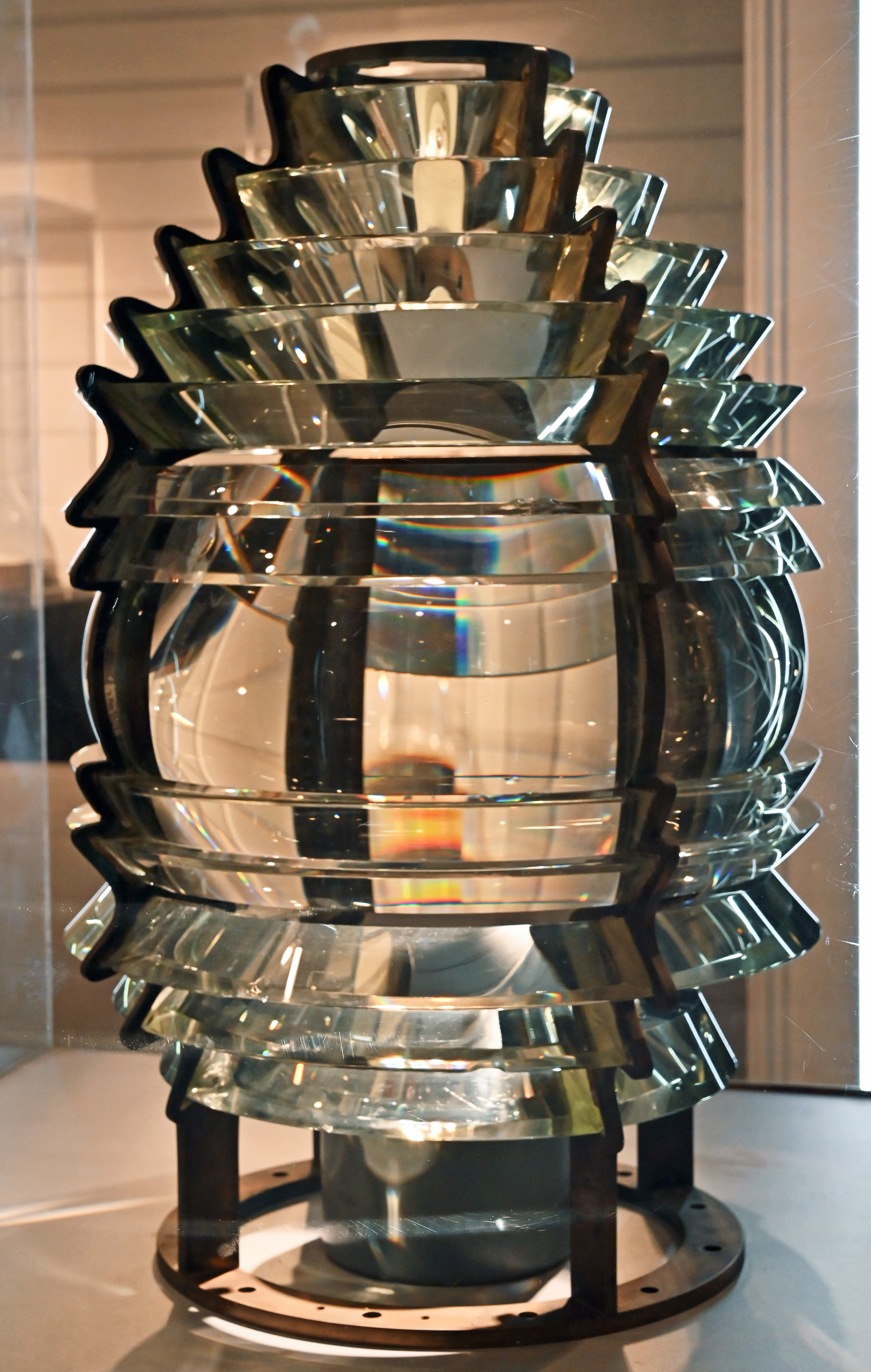
Fifth-order lens, at Key West Lighthouse

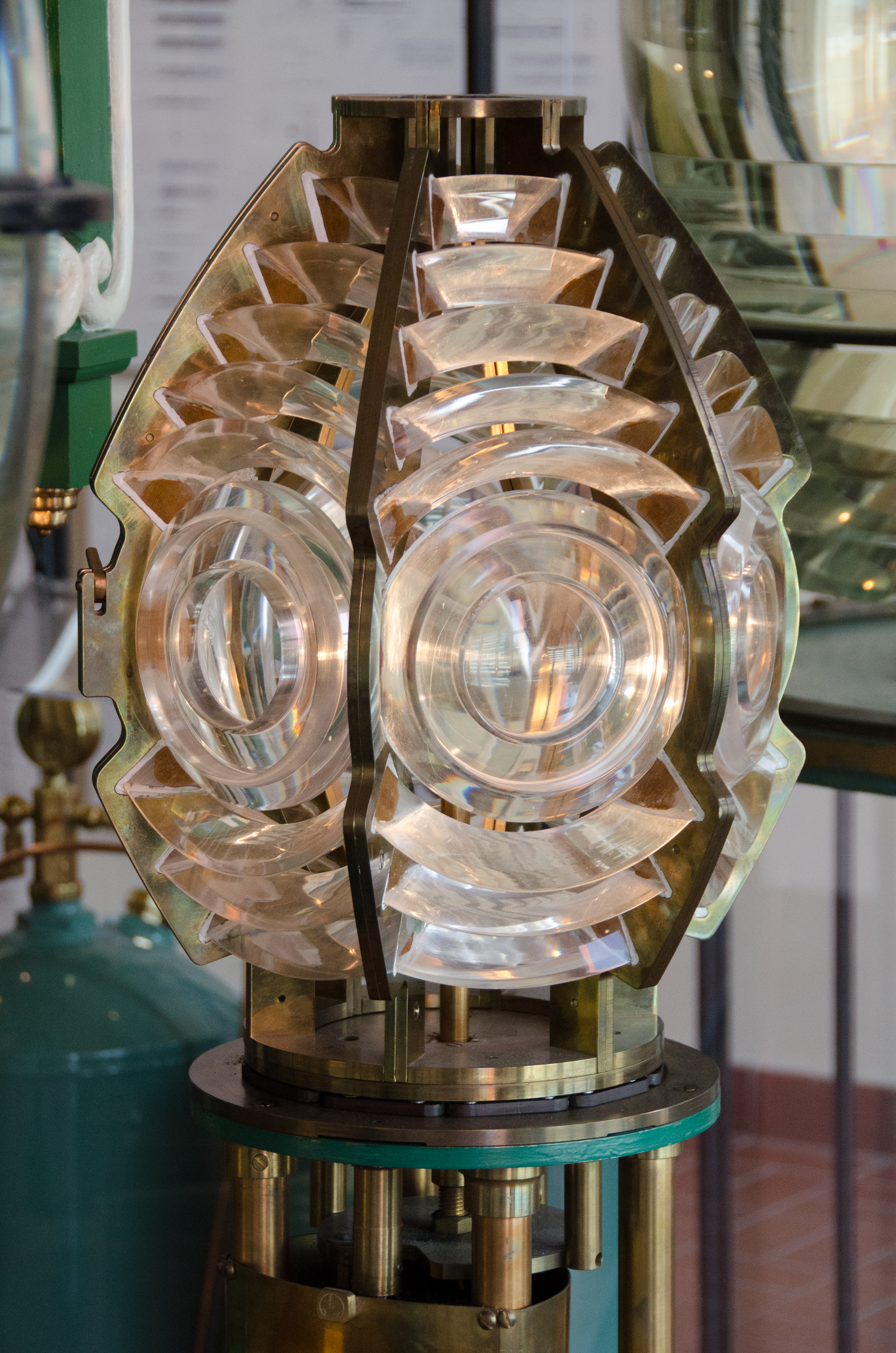
Sixth-order lens (Ponce de Leon Inlet Light)

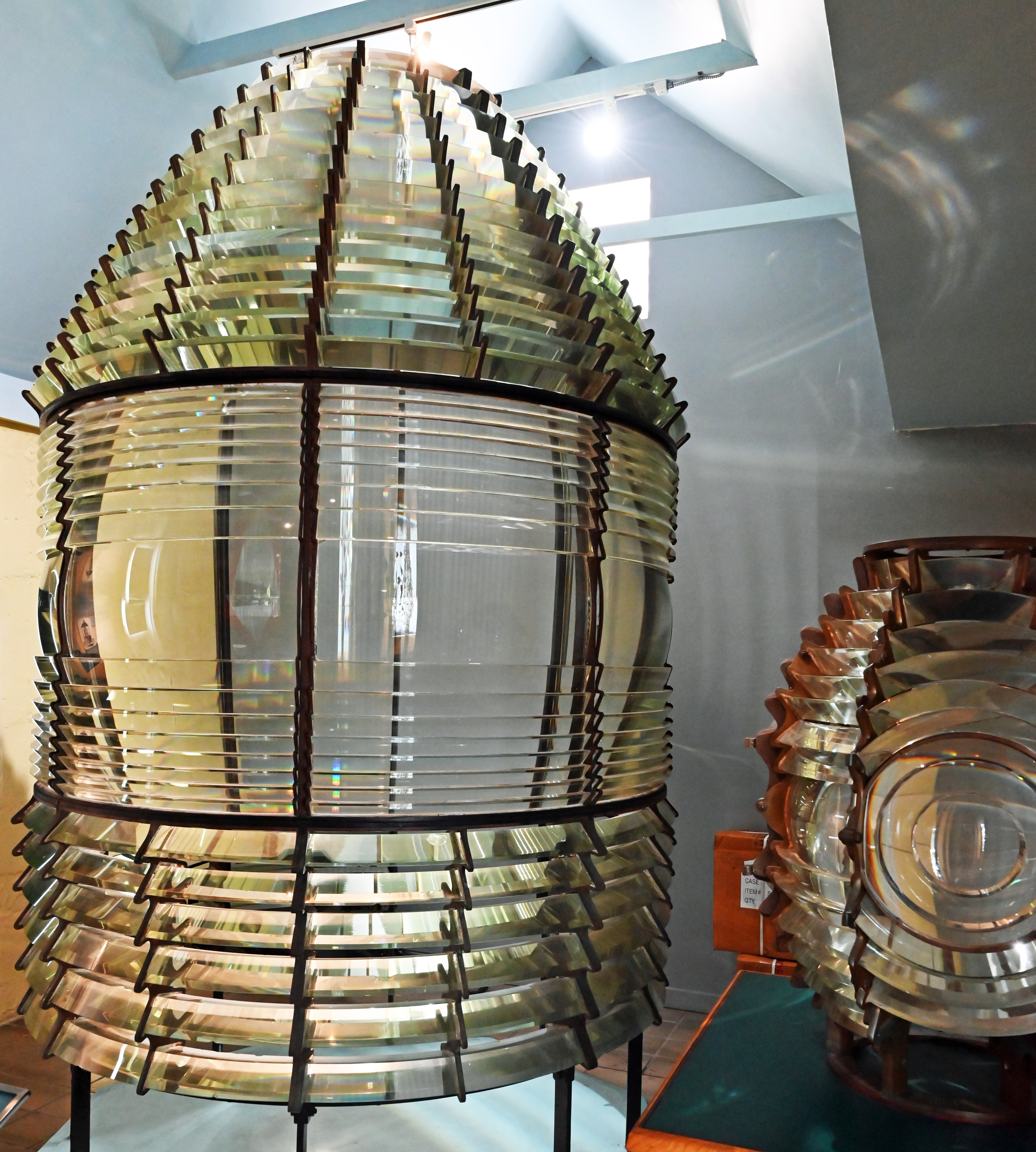
Comparison of first- and fourth-order lenses (Key West Lighthouse)

== Types ==
There are two main types of Fresnel lens: imaging and non-imaging. Imaging Fresnel lenses use segments with curved cross-sections and produce sharp images, while non-imaging lenses have segments with flat cross-sections, and do not produce sharp images. As the number of segments increases, the two types of lens become more similar to each other. In the abstract case of an infinite number of segments, the difference between curved and flat segments disappears.

Imaging lenses can be classified as:

Spherical
A spherical Fresnel lens is equivalent to a simple spherical lens, using ring-shaped segments that are each a portion of a sphere, that all focus light on a single point. This type of lens produces a sharp image, although not quite as clear as the equivalent simple spherical lens due to diffraction at the edges of the ridges. This type is sometimes called a kinoform when the ridges are microscopic, at the wavelength scale.
Cylindrical
A cylindrical Fresnel lens is equivalent to a simple cylindrical lens, using straight segments with circular cross-section, focusing light on a single line. This type produces a sharp image, although not quite as clear as the equivalent simple cylindrical lens due to diffraction at the edges of the ridges.

Non-imaging lenses can be classified as:

Spot
A non-imaging spot Fresnel lens uses ring-shaped segments with cross sections that are straight lines rather than circular arcs. Such a lens can focus light on a small spot, but does not produce a sharp image. These lenses have application in solar power, such as focusing sunlight on a solar panel. Fresnel lenses may be used as components of Köhler illumination optics resulting in very effective nonimaging optics Fresnel-Köhler (FK) solar concentrators.
Linear
A non-imaging linear Fresnel lens uses straight segments whose cross sections are straight lines rather than arcs. These lenses focus light into a narrow band. They do not produce a sharp image, but can be used in solar power, such as for focusing sunlight on a pipe, to heat the water within.

== Uses ==
=== Illumination ===
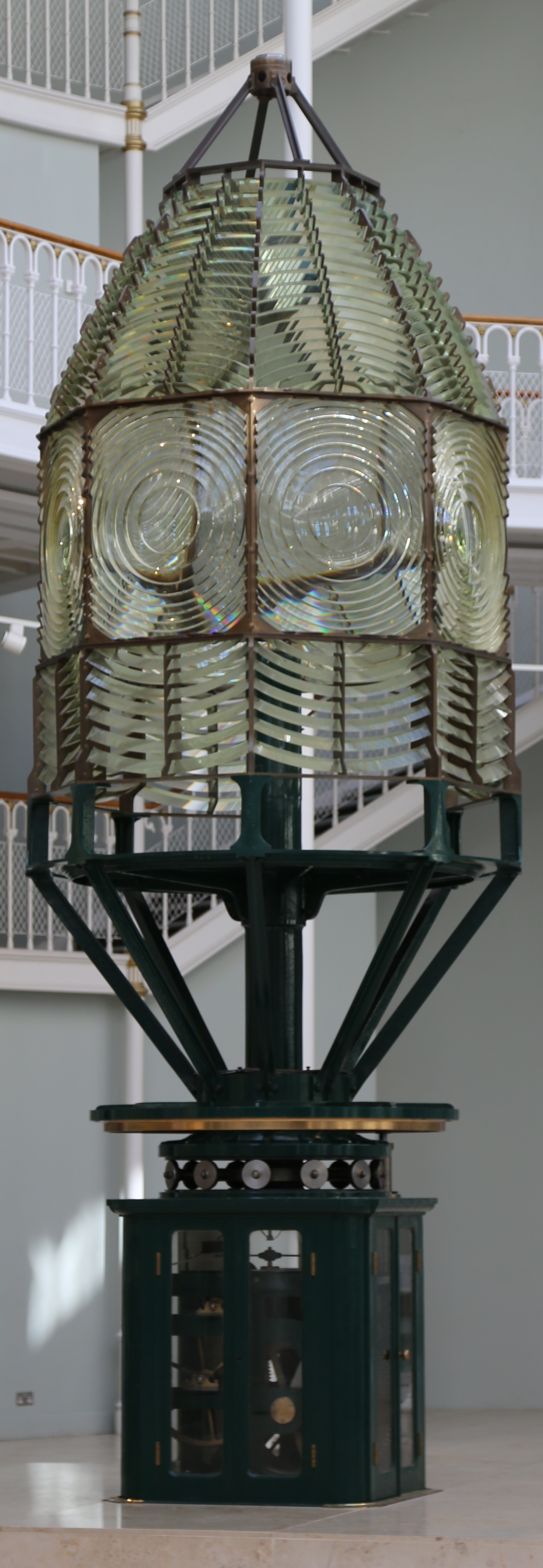
Inchkeith lighthouse lens and drive mechanism

High-quality glass Fresnel lenses were used in lighthouses, where they were considered state of the art in the late 19th and through the middle of the 20th centuries. These lighthouse Fresnel lens systems typically include extra annular prismatic elements, arrayed in faceted domes above and below the central planar Fresnel, in order to catch all light emitted from the light source. The light path through these elements can include an internal reflection, rather than the simple refraction in the planar Fresnel element. These lenses conferred many practical benefits upon the designers, builders, and users of lighthouses and their illumination. Among other things, smaller lenses could fit into more compact spaces. Greater light transmission over longer distances, and varied patterns, made it possible to triangulate a position. Starting in the mid-20th century, most lighthouses have retired glass Fresnel lenses from service and replaced them with much less expensive and more durable aerobeacons or similar systems, including the Vega Industries VRB-25, which contains plastic Fresnel lens panels.

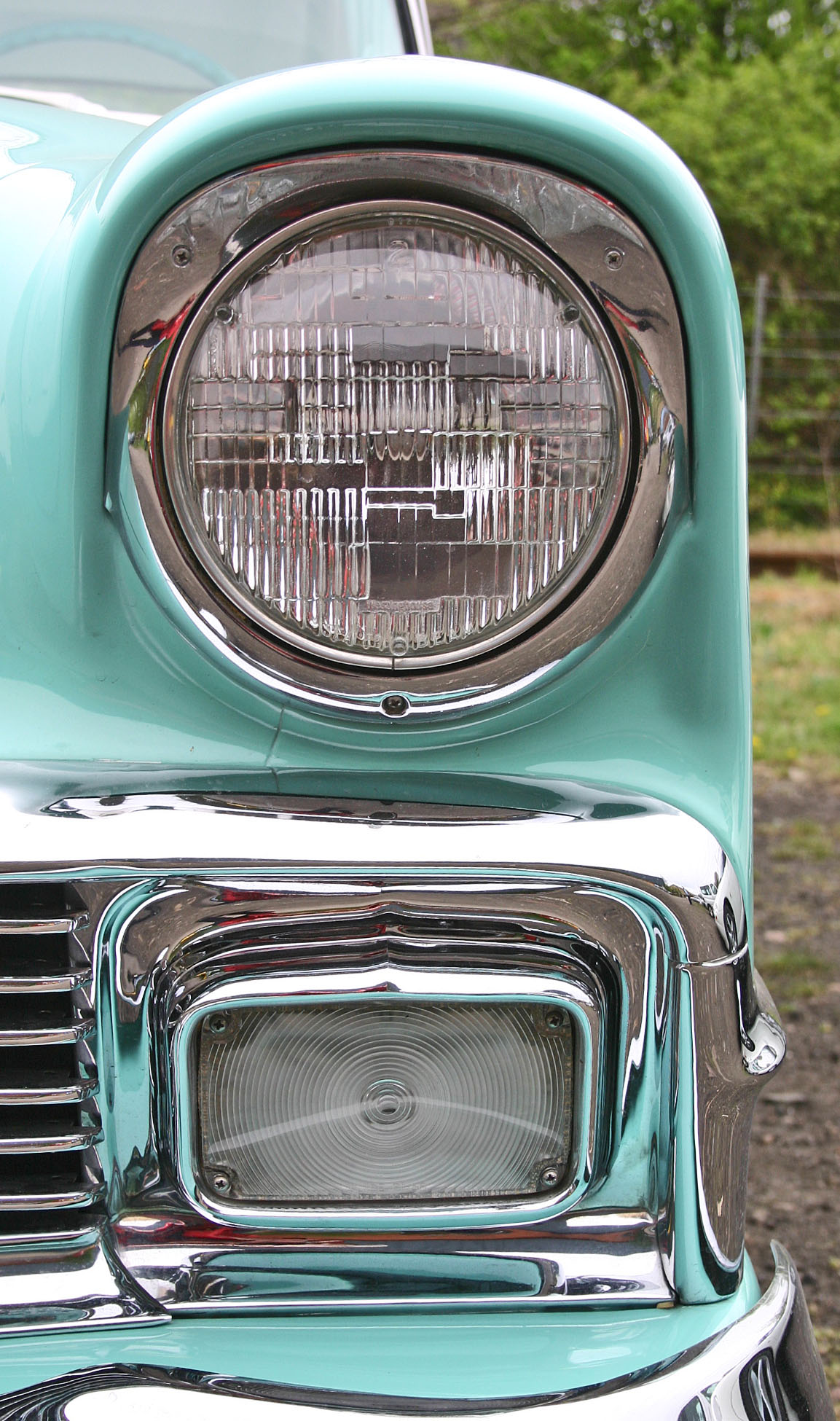
1956 Bel Air, with Fresnel lenses in round headlamp and rectangular marker lamp

Perhaps the most widespread use of Fresnel lenses, for a time, occurred in automobile headlamps, where they can shape the roughly parallel beam from the parabolic reflector to meet requirements for dipped and main-beam patterns, often both in the same headlamp unit (such as the European H4 design). For reasons of economy, weight, and impact resistance, newer cars have dispensed with glass Fresnel lenses for sealed beam headlamp units, instead using multifaceted reflectors with plain polycarbonate lenses. However, Fresnel lenses continue in wide use in automobile tail, marker, and reversing lights.

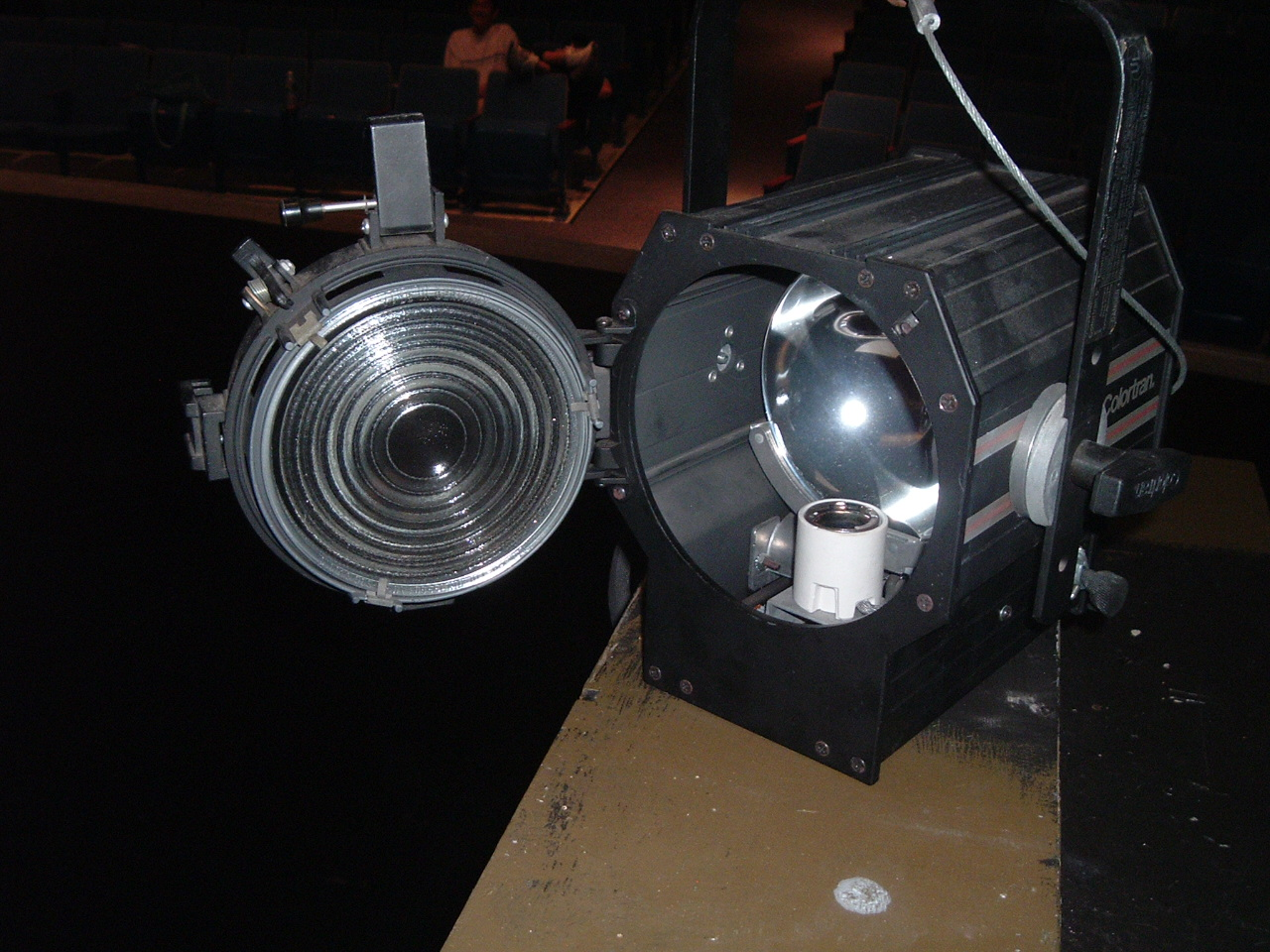
A Fresnel lantern with the lens open to show the ridges

Glass Fresnel lenses also are used in lighting instruments for theatre and motion pictures (see Fresnel lantern); such instruments are often called simply Fresnels. The entire instrument consists of a metal housing, a reflector, a lamp assembly, and a Fresnel lens. Many Fresnel instruments allow the lamp to be moved relative to the lens' focal point, to increase or decrease the size of the light beam. As a result, they are very flexible, and can often produce a beam as narrow as 7° or as wide as 70°. The Fresnel lens produces a very soft-edged beam, so is often used as a wash light. A holder in front of the lens can hold a colored plastic film (gel) to tint the light or wire screens or frosted plastic to diffuse it. The Fresnel lens is useful in the making of motion pictures not only because of its ability to focus the beam brighter than a typical lens, but also because the light is a relatively consistent intensity across the entire width of the beam of light.

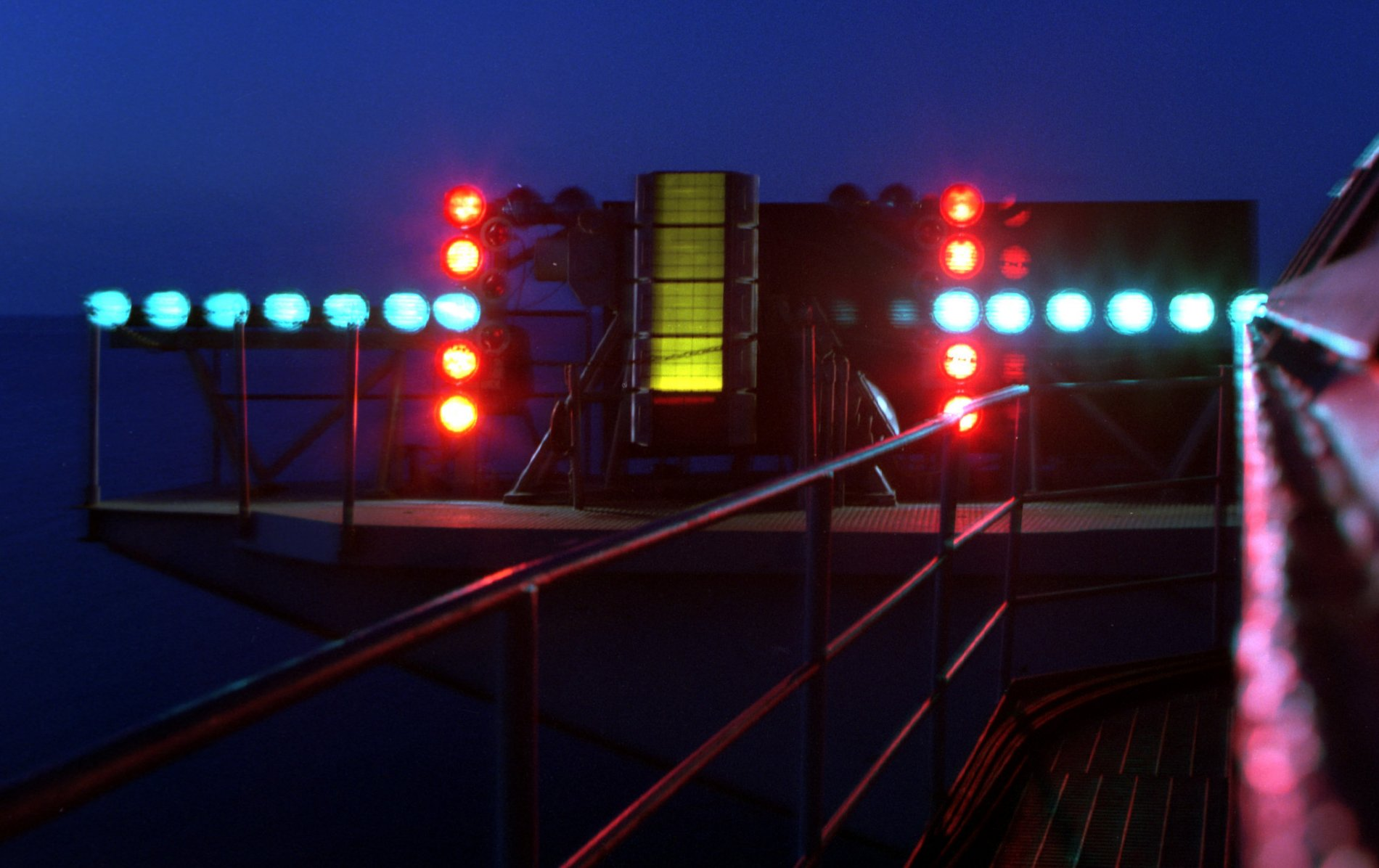
Optical landing system on US Navy aircraft carrier USS Dwight D. Eisenhower

Aircraft carriers and naval air stations typically use Fresnel lenses in their optical landing systems. The "meatball" light aids the pilot in maintaining proper glide slope for the landing. In the center are amber and red lights composed of Fresnel lenses. Although the lights are always on, the angle of the lens from the pilot's point of view determines the color and position of the visible light. If the lights appear above the green horizontal bar, the pilot is too high. If it is below, the pilot is too low, and if the lights are red, the pilot is very low.

Fresnel lenses are also commonly used in searchlights, spotlights, and flashlights. Another use of such Lenses are in 300 mm (12 inch) code beacons placed on radio and television towers. The number of such beacons being a function of height as specified by the FAA. These beacons contain two 300 watt incandescent lamps. Perhaps unlike the lenses in lighthouses these two piece beacons were made of circular cast glass. The latest technology is to utilize LED optics in a non Fresnel configuration to supply the needed obstruction characteristics.

=== Imaging ===
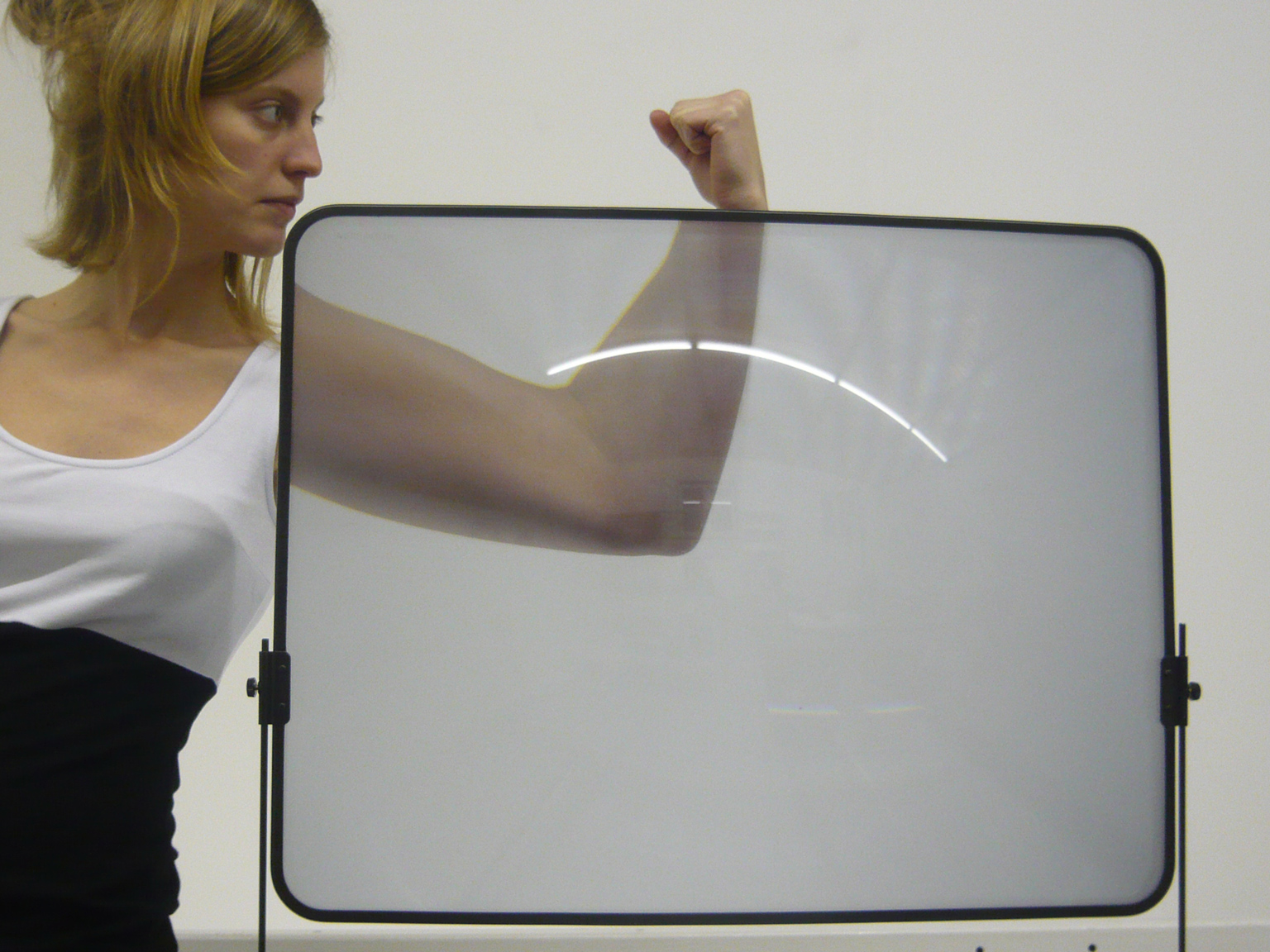
A plastic Fresnel lens sold as a TV-screen enlarging device

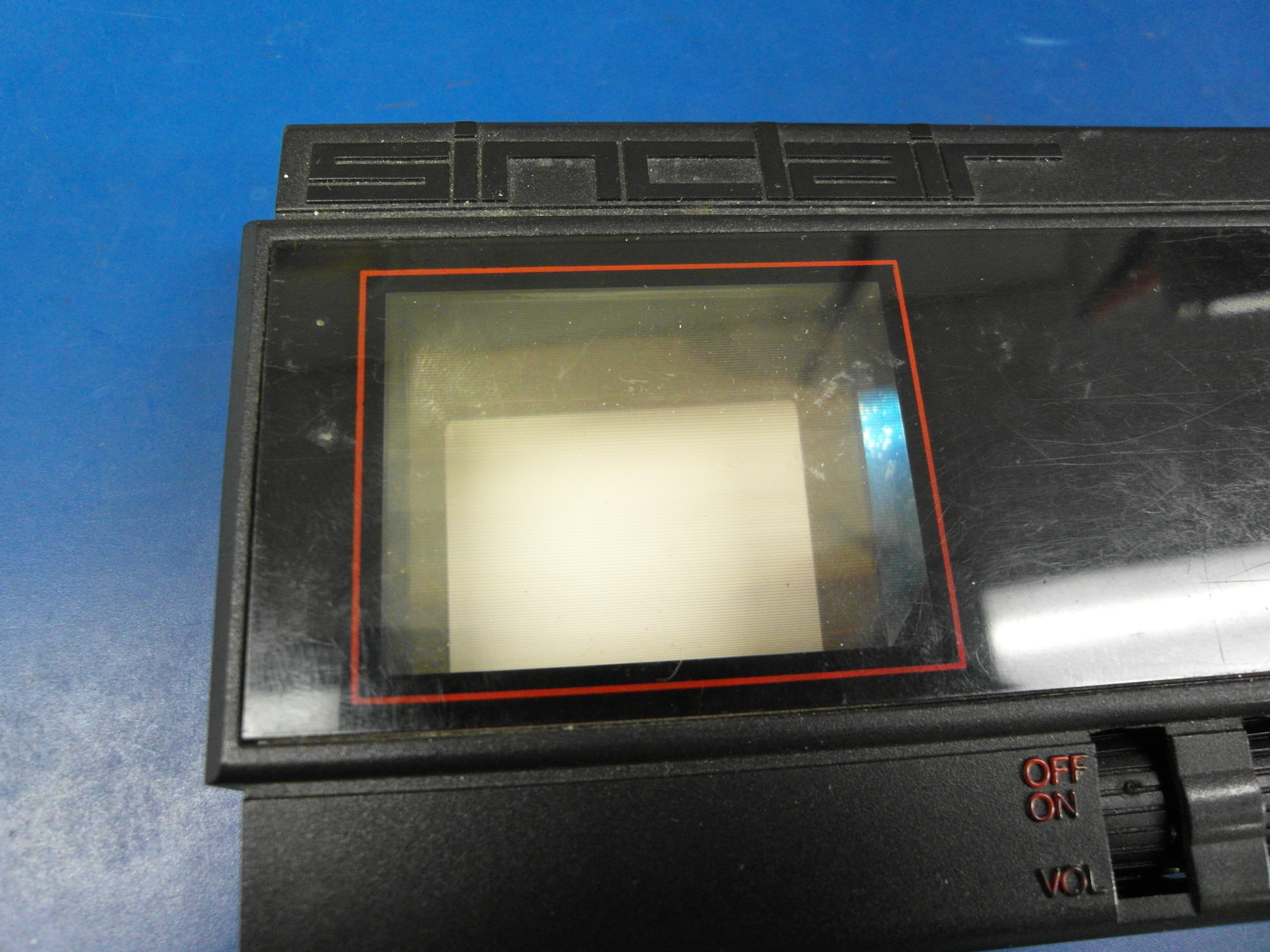
The Fresnel lens used in the Sinclair FTV1 portable CRT TV, which enlarges the vertical aspect of the display only

Fresnel lenses are used as simple hand-held magnifiers. They are also used to correct several visual disorders, including ocular-motility disorders such as strabismus. Fresnel lenses have been used to increase the visual size of CRT displays in pocket televisions, notably the Sinclair TV80. They are also used in traffic lights.

Fresnel lenses are used in left-hand-drive European lorries entering the UK and Republic of Ireland (and vice versa, right-hand-drive Irish and British trucks entering mainland Europe) to overcome the blind spots caused by the driver operating the lorry while sitting on the wrong side of the cab relative to the side of the road the car is on. They attach to the passenger-side window.

Another automobile application of a Fresnel lens is a rear view enhancer, as the wide view angle of a lens attached to the rear window permits examining the scene behind a vehicle, particularly a tall or bluff-tailed one, more effectively than a rear-view mirror alone. Fresnel lenses have been used on rangefinding equipment and projected map display screens.

Fresnel lenses have also been used in the field of popular entertainment. The British rock artist Peter Gabriel made use of them in his early solo live performances to magnify the size of his head in contrast to the rest of his body, for dramatic and comic effect. In the Terry Gilliam film Brazil, Fresnel lenses are used as magnifiers for small CRT monitors in the Ministry of Information. The lenses occasionally appear between the actors and the camera, distorting the scale and composition of the scene to humorous effect. In the Pixar movie Wall-E, the protagonist watches the musical Hello, Dolly! on an iPod, magnified by a Fresnel lens.

Virtual reality headsets, such as the Meta Quest 2 and the HTC Vive Pro use Fresnel lenses, as they allow a thinner and lighter form factor than regular lenses. Newer devices, such as the Meta Quest Pro, have switched to a pancake lens design due to its smaller form factor and less chromatic aberration than Fresnel lenses.

Multi-focal Fresnel lenses are also used as a part of retina identification cameras, where they provide multiple in- and out-of-focus images of a fixation target inside the camera. For virtually all users, at least one of the images will be in focus, thus allowing correct eye alignment.

Many cameras are equipped with viewfinders which project the scene through a lens onto a ground glass screen for focusing and composition, including view, twin-lens reflex, and single-lens reflex cameras; often a Fresnel condenser lens is applied to the ground glass to increase the perceived brightness of the projected image and make the illumination more even from center to corner. For example, the Polaroid SX-70 camera uses a Fresnel reflector as part of its viewing system.

==== Projection ====
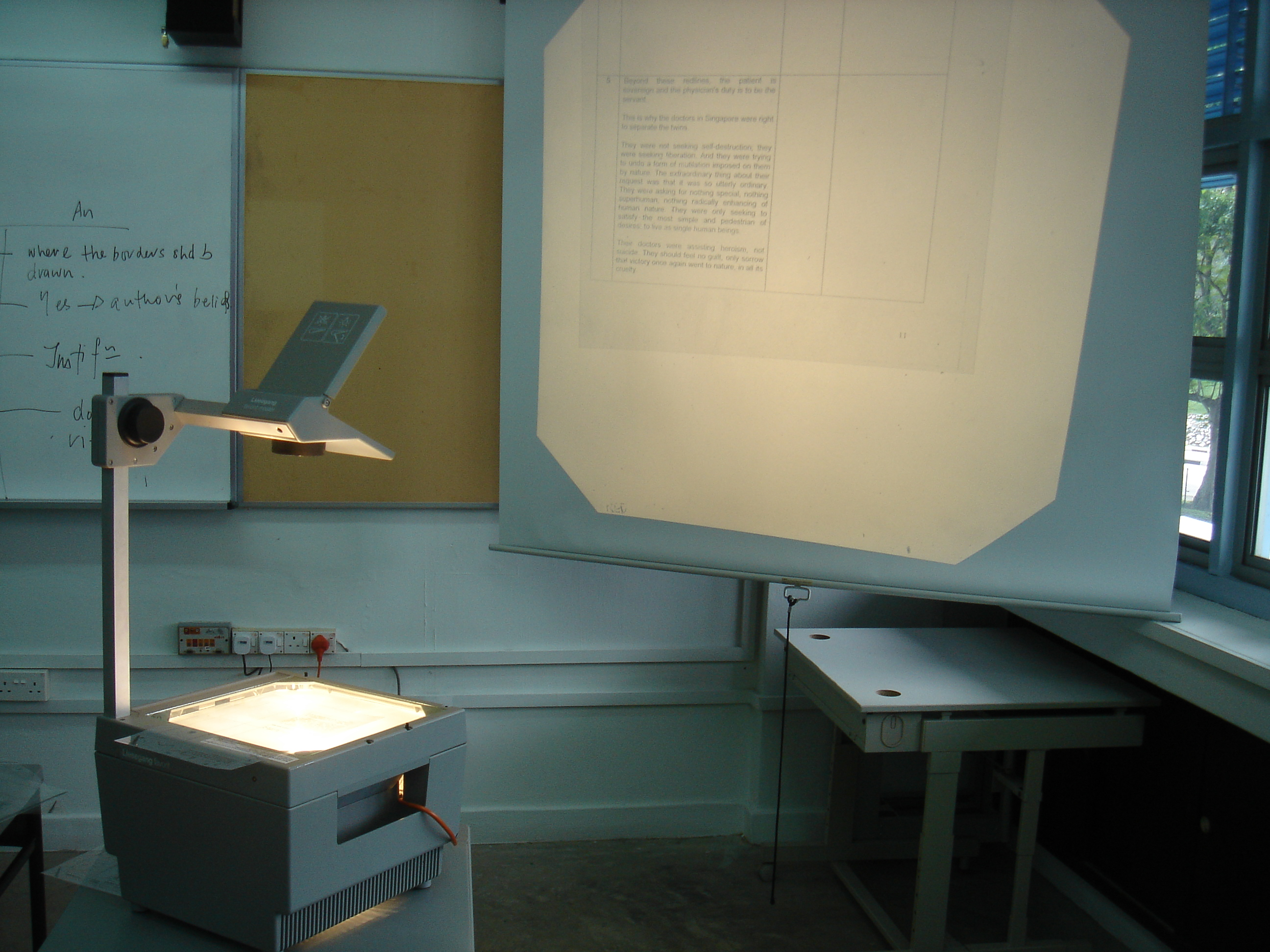
An overhead projector in use

The use of Fresnel lenses for image projection reduces image quality, so they tend to occur only where quality is not critical or where the bulk of a solid lens would be prohibitive. Cheap Fresnel lenses can be stamped or molded of transparent plastic and are used in overhead projectors and projection televisions.

Fresnel lenses of different focal lengths (one collimator, and one collector) are used in commercial and DIY projection. The collimator lens has the lower focal length and is placed closer to the light source, and the collector lens, which focuses the light into the triplet lens, is placed after the projection image (an active matrix LCD panel in LCD projectors). Fresnel lenses are also used as collimators in overhead projectors.

=== Solar power ===
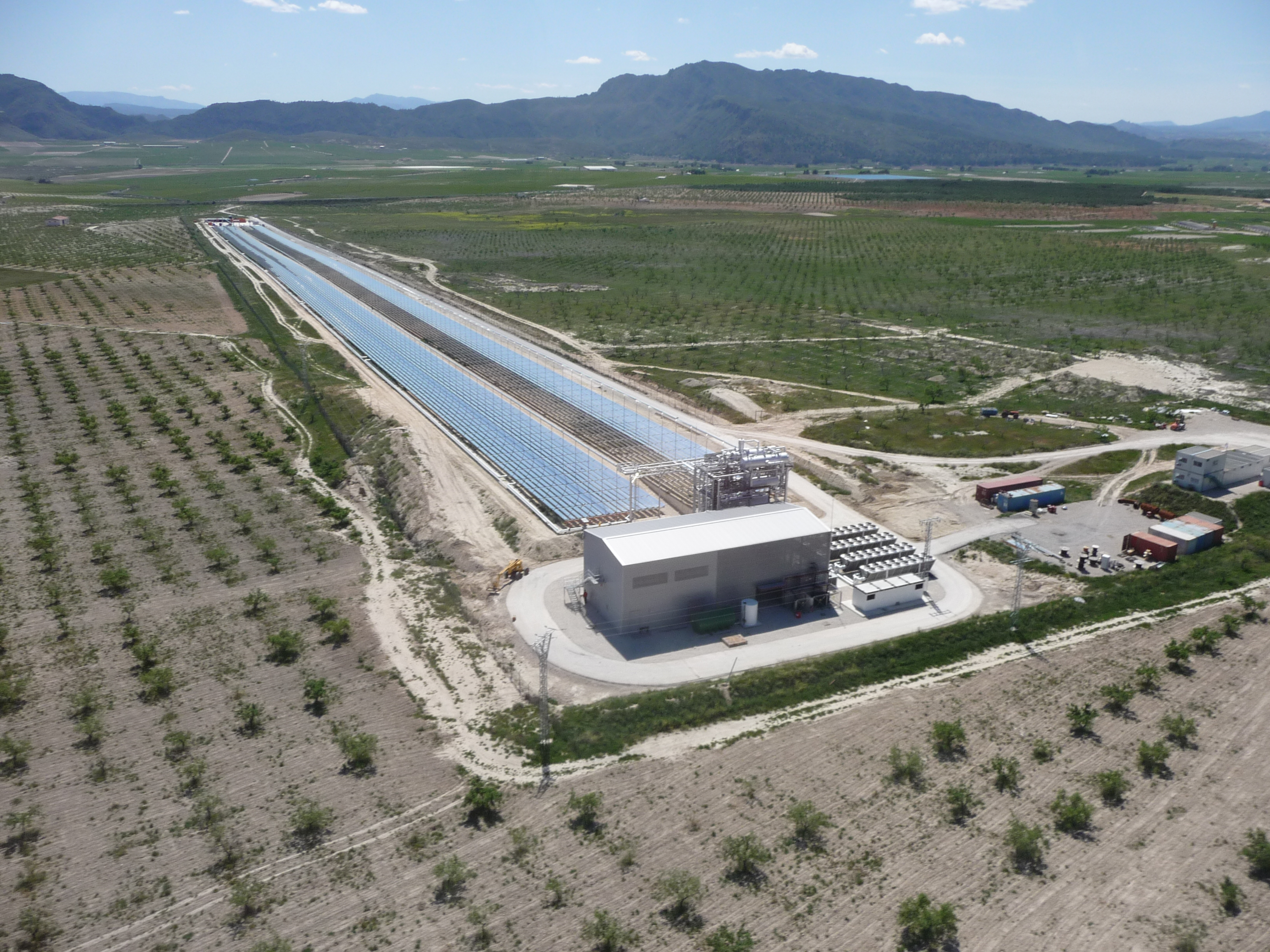
Solar power plant based on linear Fresnel lenses

Since plastic Fresnel lenses can be made larger than glass lenses, as well as being much cheaper and lighter, they are used to concentrate sunlight for heating in solar cookers, in solar forges, and in solar collectors used to heat water for domestic use. They can also be used to generate steam or to power a Stirling engine to generate electricity.

Fresnel lenses can concentrate sunlight onto solar cells with a ratio of almost 500:1. This allows the active solar-cell surface to be reduced, lowering cost and allowing the use of more efficient cells that would otherwise be too expensive. In the early 21st century, Fresnel reflectors began to be used in concentrating solar power (CSP) plants to concentrate solar energy. One application was to preheat water at the coal-fired Liddell Power Station, in Hunter Valley Australia.

Fresnel lenses can be used to sinter sand, allowing 3D printing in glass.

=== Anidolic focusing for detection purposes ===
Where imaging is not required, a passive infrared sensor equipped with multiple low-quality Fresnel lenses can be used to collect infrared energy from a wide area and focus it for motion detection in both area-protection and energy-saving applications. The plastic used is selected for its transparency to infrared energy as well as being UV-stabilised for outdoor durability.

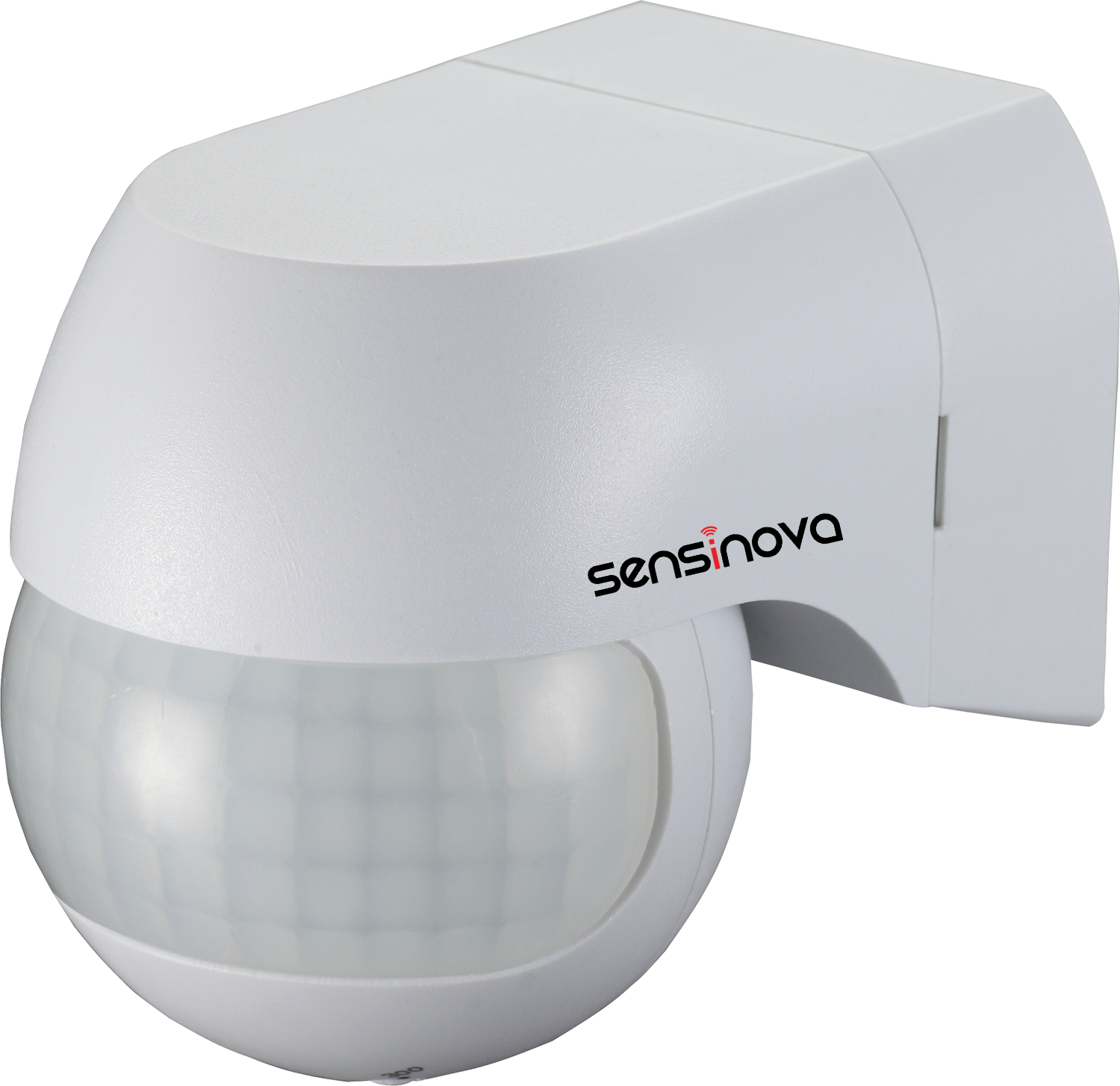
PIR motion sensor design

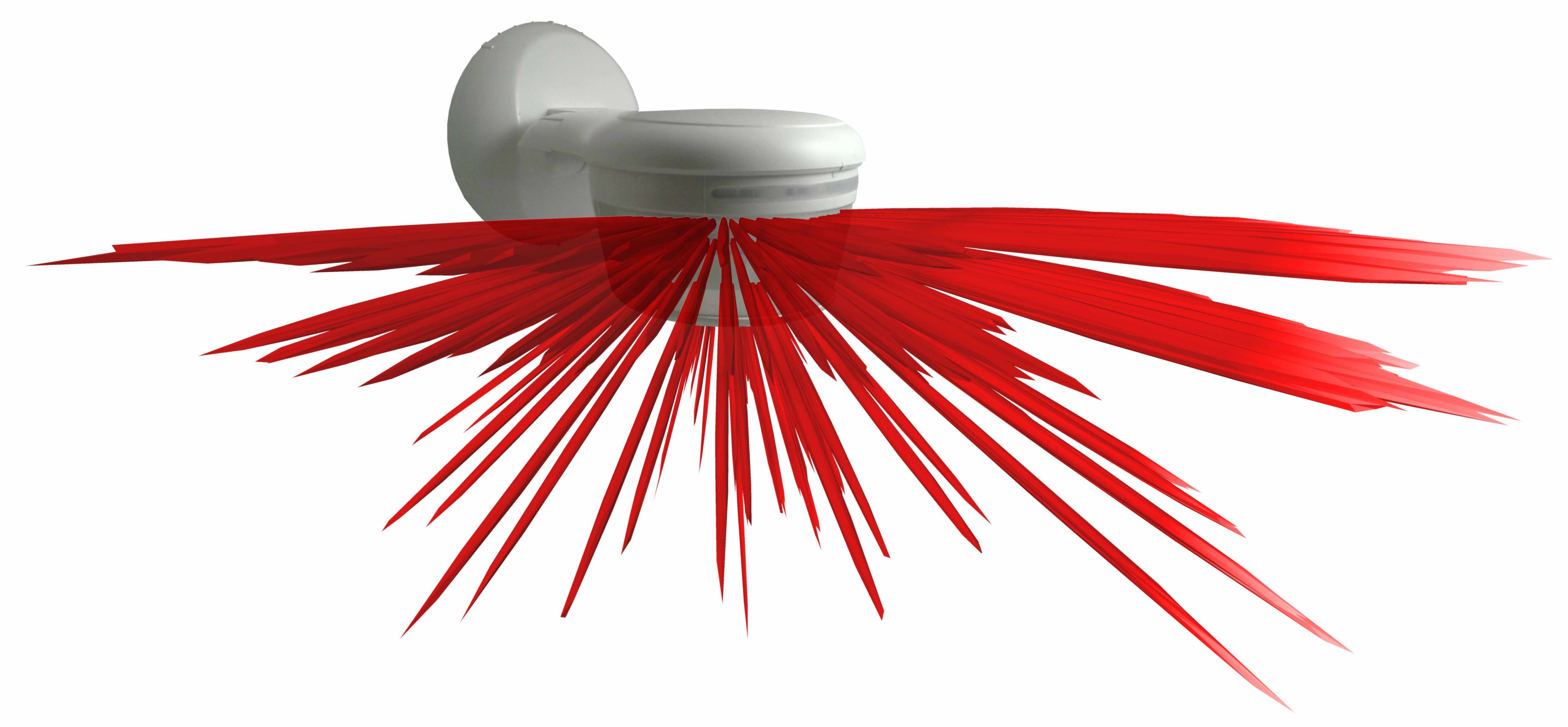
Motion detector with superimposed beam pattern. The length of the beams is a measure of the detector's sensitivity in that direction.

== See also ==
- Fresnel imager
- Fresnel zone plate
- Lenticular lens
- Linear Fresnel reflector
- Prism lighting
- Pharology

== Bibliography ==
- M. Born and E. Wolf, Principles of Optics, 7th Ed., Cambridge, 1999.
- G.-A. Boutry, 1948, "Augustin Fresnel: His time, life and work, 1788–1827", Science Progress, vol. 36, no. 144 (October 1948), pp. 587–604; jstor.org/stable/43413515.
- J. Z. Buchwald, 1989, The Rise of the Wave Theory of Light: Optical Theory and Experiment in the Early Nineteenth Century, University of Chicago Press, ISBN 978-0-226-07886-1.
- J. Elton, 2009, "A Light to Lighten our Darkness: Lighthouse Optics and the Later Development of Fresnel's Revolutionary Refracting Lens 1780–1900", International Journal for the History of Engineering & Technology, vol. 79, no. 2 (July 2009), pp. 183–244; doi:10.1179/175812109X449612.
- A. Fresnel, 1822, "Mémoire sur un nouveau système d'éclairage des phares", read 29 July 1822; reprinted in Fresnel, 1866–1870, vol. 3, pp. 97–126; translated by T. Tag as "Memoir upon a new system of lighthouse illumination", U.S. Lighthouse Society, accessed 26 August 2017; archived 19 August 2016. (Cited page numbers refer to the translation.)
- A. Fresnel (ed. H. de Sénarmont, E. Verdet, and L. Fresnel), 1866–1870, Oeuvres complètes d'Augustin Fresnel (3 vols.), Paris: Imprimerie Impériale; vol. 1 (1866), vol. 2 (1868), vol. 3 (1870).
- Levitt, T. H. (2013). A Short Bright Flash: Augustin Fresnel and the Birth of the Modern Lighthouse. New York: W.W. Norton. ISBN 978-0-393-35089-0.
- T. Young (ed. G. Peacock), 1855, Miscellaneous Works of the late Thomas Young, London: J. Murray, vol. 1.
