= Electromagnetic metasurface =

Type of artificial sheet material

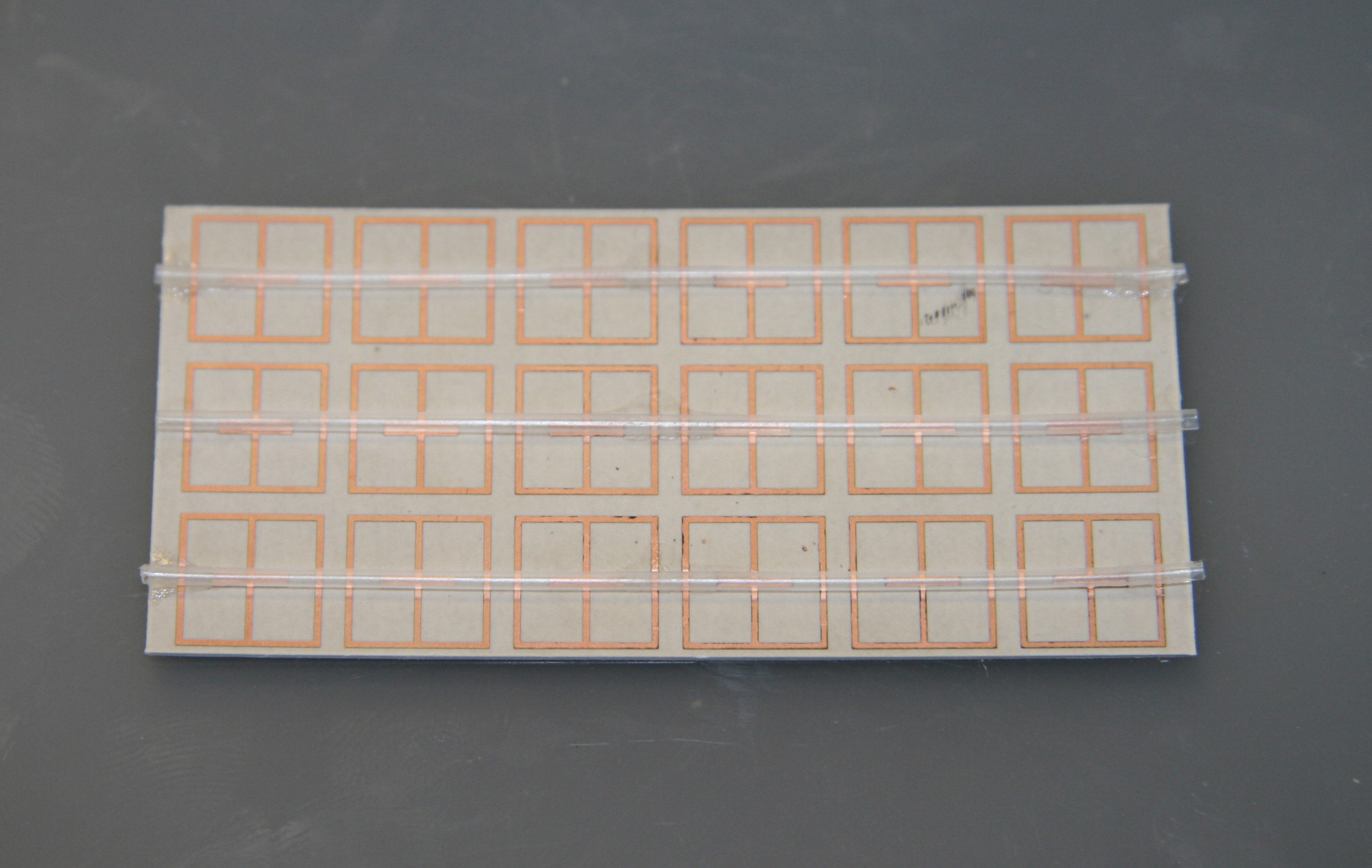
A liquid-tunable electromagnetic metasurface

An electromagnetic metasurface is an artificially engineered, two-dimensional material designed to control the behavior of electromagnetic waves through arrays of subwavelength features. Unlike bulk metamaterials, which achieve unusual properties through three-dimensional structuring, metasurfaces manipulate waves at an interface by imposing abrupt changes in amplitude, phase, or polarization. Their thin, planar form factor allows them to perform functions traditionally requiring bulky optical components, such as lenses or polarizers, within a single ultrathin layer.

Metasurfaces are typically constructed from periodic or aperiodic arrangements of resonant elements, such as metallic antennas, dielectric scatterers, or patterned films, that interact with incident waves. Depending on design, they can operate in reflective, transmissive, or absorbing modes, enabling applications in beam steering, wavefront shaping, holography, and dispersion engineering. More advanced designs integrate tunable materials (e.g., liquid crystals, graphene, or phase-change compounds), creating reconfigurable intelligent surfaces that allow dynamic, programmable control of scattering and radiation patterns.

Historically, metasurfaces build on early studies of anomalous diffraction in metallic gratings (Wood's anomaly, 1902) and the later development of surface plasmon polaritons. The field expanded significantly in the early 2000s with the advent of plasmonic nanostructures and in the 2010s with the demonstration of "flat optics" and planar holograms. Since then, metasurfaces have been developed for a wide range of wavelengths, from radio frequency (RF) and microwave to visible light, enabling research in stealth technology, communications, imaging, and biosensing.

Metasurfaces are widely studied as a versatile platform for electromagnetic and optical engineering. They serve both as tools for exploring generalized laws of reflection and refraction, and as enabling technologies for compact optical systems, radar cross-section reduction, integrated photonics, and bioimaging. Their rapid development has established them as a significant topic in contemporary nanophotonics, antenna research, and materials science.

== Definition and categorization ==
A metasurface is generally defined as an artificially structured, two-dimensional array of subwavelength elements that collectively control the properties of electromagnetic waves at an interface. Because their thickness is negligible compared to the wavelength of operation, metasurfaces can be treated as discontinuities that impose abrupt changes in the amplitude, phase, or polarization of incoming waves.

Although various authors emphasize different aspects, such as arrays of nanoantennas, periodic scattering elements, or ultrathin films with unusual absorption, the unifying concept is that metasurfaces derive their functionality from engineered two-dimensional structures rather than from bulk material composition.

Metasurfaces can be classified in several complementary ways, depending on their mode of interaction, functional intent, or implementation mechanism. These categories often overlap: a single device may be both reflective and reconfigurable, or simultaneously serve beam-steering and polarization-conversion purposes.

By interaction

- Reflective (Reflectarray antenna) – reshape incident waves by reflection, typically using a metallic ground plane.
- Transmissive (Transmitarray antenna) – modify waves as they pass through, functioning as ultrathin lenses.
- Absorbing (Metamaterial absorber) –suppresses reflection and transmission to achieve near-perfect absorption.

By functional intent

- Beam steering and focusing – redirect or concentrate energy through phase-gradient control.
- Wavefront shaping and holography – generate structured beams (holograms, vortex beams) using amplitude and phase control.
- Dispersion engineering – design frequency/time response for filtering or chromatic correction.
- Polarization conversion – convert between linear and circular polarization states, often via geometric-phase (Pancharatnam–Berry) elements.

By mechanism

- Passive metasurfaces – rely on fixed geometry to yield a static response (e.g., holographic or leaky-wave designs).
- Reconfigurable metasurfaces (also called RIS or programmable metasurfaces) – incorporate tunable components such as MEMS, liquid crystals, or graphene to allow dynamic control of scattering and radiation patterns.

== History ==
The research on electromagnetic metasurfaces has a long history. Early in 1902, Robert W. Wood found that the reflection spectra of subwavelength metallic grating had dark areas. This unusual phenomenon was named Wood's anomaly and led to the discovery of the surface plasmon polariton (SPP), a particular electromagnetic wave excited at metal surfaces. Subsequently, another important phenomenon, the Levi-Civita relation, was introduced, which states that a subwavelength-thick film can result in a dramatic change in electromagnetic boundary conditions.

Generally speaking, metasurfaces could include some traditional concepts in the microwave spectrum, such as frequency-selective surfaces (FSS), impedance sheets, and even Ohmic sheets. In the microwave regime, the thickness of these metasurfaces can be much smaller than the wavelength of operation (for example, 1/1000 of the wavelength) since the skin depth could be minimal for highly conductive metals. Recently, some novel phenomena were demonstrated, such as ultra-broadband coherent perfect absorption. The results showed that a 0.3 nm thick film could absorb all electromagnetic waves across the RF, microwave, and terahertz frequencies.

In optical applications, an anti-reflective coating could also be regarded as a simple metasurface, as first observed by Lord Rayleigh.

In recent years, several new metasurfaces have been developed, including plasmonic metasurfaces, metasurfaces based on geometric phases, metasurfaces based on impedance sheets, and glide-symmetric metasurfaces.

== Applications ==
One of the most important applications of metasurfaces is to control a wavefront of electromagnetic waves by imparting local, gradient phase shifts to the incoming waves, which leads to a generalization of the ancient laws of reflection and refraction. In this way, a metasurface can be used as a planar lens, illumination lens, planar hologram, vortex generator, beam deflector, axicon and so on.

Besides the gradient metasurface lenses, metasurface-based superlenses offer another degree of control of the wavefront by using evanescent waves. With surface plasmons in the ultrathin metallic layers, perfect imaging and super-resolution lithography could be possible, which breaks the common assumption that all optical lens systems are limited by diffraction, a phenomenon called the diffraction limit.

All-dielectric subwavelength metasurface focusing lens operating in the near infrared has been demonstrated by the Shalaev group in collaboration with the Raytheon team. This lens is currently used in Raytheon defense system products.

Another promising application is in the field of stealth technology. A target's radar cross-section (RCS) has conventionally been reduced by either radiation-absorbent material (RAM) or by purpose shaping of the target such that the scattered energy can be redirected away from the source. Unfortunately, RAMs have narrow frequency-band functionality, and purpose shaping limits the aerodynamic performance of the target. Metasurfaces have been synthesized that redirect scattered energy away from the source using either array theory or the generalized Snell's law. This has led to aerodynamically favorable shapes for the targets with reduced RCS.

Metasurface can also be integrated with optical waveguides for controlling guided electromagnetic waves. Applications for meta-waveguides such as integrated waveguide mode converters, structured-light generations, versatile multiplexers, and photonic neural networks can be enabled.

In addition, metasurfaces are also applied in electromagnetic absorbers, polarization converters, polarimeters, and spectrum filters. Metasurface-empowered novel bioimaging and biosensing devices have also emerged and been reported recently. For many optically based bioimaging devices, their bulk footprint and heavy physical weight have limited their usage in clinical settings.

== Simulation ==
Various methods are available for simulating the interaction of electromagnetic waves on metasurfaces, and to enable their design, such as finite-difference time-domain (FDTD), finite-element methods (FEM), and rigorous coupled-wave analysis (RCWA).

For planar optical metasurfaces, prism-based algorithms allow for triangular prismatic space discretization, which is optimal for planar geometries. The prism-based algorithm has fewer elements than conventional tetrahedral methods, bringing higher computational efficiency. A simulation toolkit has been released online, enabling users to efficiently analyze metasurfaces with customized pixel patterns.

== Optical characterization ==
Characterizing metasurfaces in the optical domain requires advanced imaging methods since the involved optical properties often include both phase and polarization properties. Recent works suggest that vectorial ptychography, a recently developed computational imaging method, can be of relevance. It combines the Jones matrix mapping with a microscopic lateral resolution, even on large specimens.

== See also ==
- Kinoform
- High impedance surface
