= Meta-waveguide =

Subwavelength-structured waveguides

In photonics, a meta-waveguide is a physical structures that guides electromagnetic waves with engineered functional subwavelength structures. Meta-waveguides are the result of combining the fields of metamaterials and metasurfaces into integrated optics. The design of the subwavelength architecture allows exotic waveguiding phenomena to be explored.

Meta-waveguides can be classified by waveguide platforms or by design methods. If classified by underlying waveguide platform, engineered subwavelength structures can be classified in combination with dielectric waveguides, optical fibers, or plasmonic waveguides. If classified by design methods, meta-waveguides can be classified as either using design primarily by physical intuition, or by computer algorithm based inverse design methods.

Meta-waveguides can provide new degrees of design freedom to the available structural library for optical waveguides in integrated photonics. Advantages can include enhancing the performance of conventional waveguide based integrated optical devices and creating novel device functionalities. Applications of meta-waveguides include beam/polarization splitting, integrated waveguide mode converters, versatile waveguide couplers, lab-on-fiber sensing, nano-optic endoscope imaging, on-chip wavefront shaping, structured-light generations, and optical neural networks. The meta-structures can also be further integrated with van der Waals materials to add more functionalities and reconfigurability.
