= Kinoform =

A kinoform is a type of computer-generated converging lens that is able to efficiently focus light to a point. They typically use holography to reproduce the optical phase profile of a normal converging lens, albeit on a flat surface.

They can be used in areas such as focusing x-ray radiation, or in the study of nanomaterials. Diamond is often used in kinoform lenses as it has a high thermal conductivity. Higher chromatic aberration is a common drawback.

== See also ==
- Metasurface
