= Atmospheric diffraction =

Wave Phenomenon

Sunrise animation (15 seconds/frame) with diffraction rings caused by water droplets and only visible when the Sun is near the horizon

Atmospheric diffraction is manifested in the following principal ways:

- Optical atmospheric diffraction
- Radio wave diffraction is the scattering of radio frequency or lower frequencies from the Earth's ionosphere, resulting in the ability to achieve greater distance radio broadcasting.
- Sound wave diffraction is the bending of sound waves, as the sound travels around edges of geometric objects. This produces the effect of being able to hear even when the source is blocked by a solid object. The sound waves bend appreciably around the solid object.

However, if the object has a diameter greater than the acoustic wavelength, a 'sound shadow' is cast behind the object where the sound is inaudible. (Note: some sound may be propagated through the object depending on material).

== Optical atmospheric diffraction ==
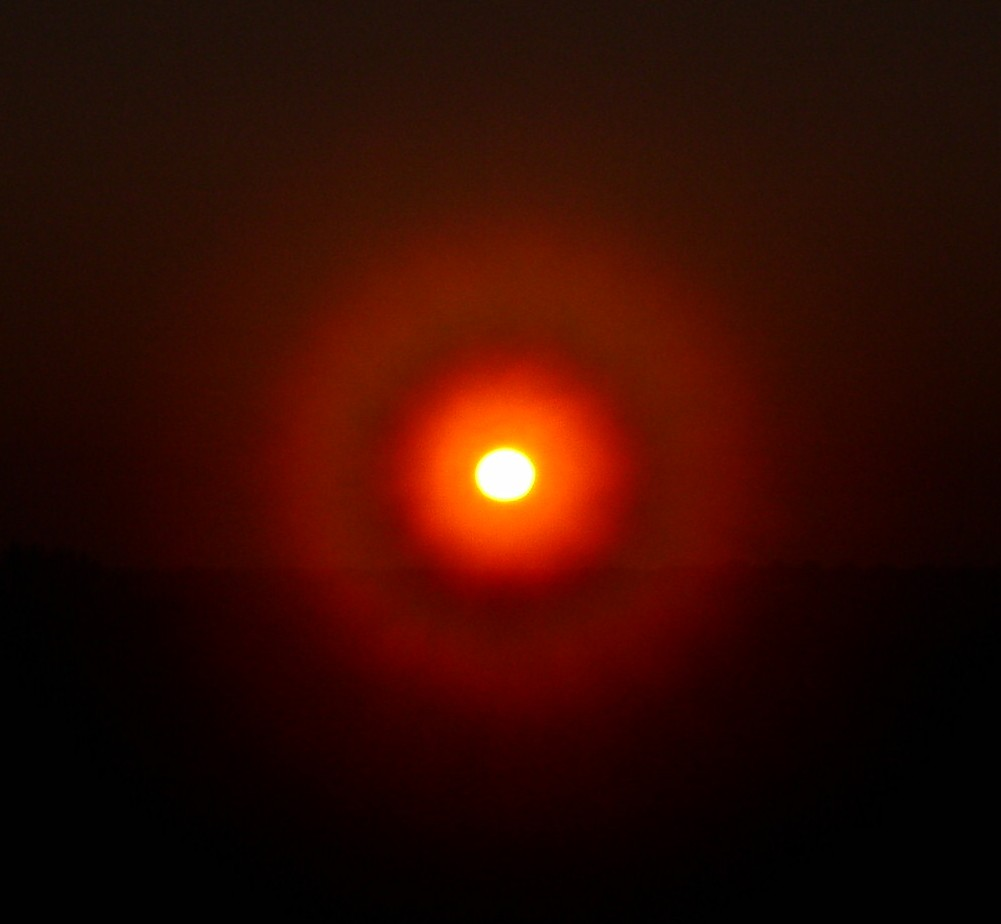
Solar diffraction ring

When light travels through thin clouds made up of nearly uniform sized water or aerosol droplets or ice crystals, diffraction or bending of light occurs as the light is diffracted by the edges of the particles. This degree of bending of light depends on the wavelength (color) of light and the size of the particles. The result is a pattern of rings, which seem to emanate from the Sun, the Moon, a planet, or another astronomical object. The most distinct part of this pattern is a central, nearly white disk. This resembles an atmospheric Airy disc but is not actually an Airy disk. It is different from rainbows and halos, which are mainly caused by refraction.

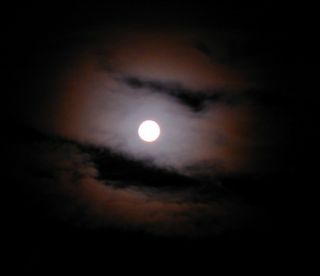
Lunar diffraction ring

The left photo shows a diffraction ring around the rising Sun caused by a veil of aerosol. This effect dramatically disappeared when the Sun rose high enough until the pattern was no longer visible on the Earth's surface. This phenomenon is sometimes called the corona effect, not to be confused with the solar corona.

On the right is a 1/10-second exposure showing an overexposed full moon. The Moon is seen through thin vaporous clouds, which glow with a bright disk surrounded by an illuminated red ring. A longer exposure would show more faint colors beyond the outside red ring.

Another form of atmospheric diffraction or bending of light occurs when light moves through fine layers of particulate dust trapped primarily in the middle layers of the troposphere. This effect differs from water based atmospheric diffraction because the dust material is opaque whereas water allows light to pass through it. This has the effect of tinting the light the color of the dust particles. This tinting can vary from red to yellow depending on geographical location. the other primary difference is that dust based diffraction acts as a magnifier instead of creating a distinct halo. This occurs because the opaque matter does not share the lensing properties of water. The effect is to make an object visibly larger while being more indistinct as the dust distorts the image. This effect varies largely based on the amount and type of dust in the atmosphere.

== Radio wave propagation in the ionosphere ==
The ionosphere is a layer of partially ionized gases high above the majority of the Earth's atmosphere; these gases are ionized by cosmic rays originating on the sun. When radio waves travel into this zone, which commences about 80 kilometers above the earth, they experience diffraction in a manner similar to the visible light phenomenon described above. In this case some of the electromagnetic energy is bent in a large arc, such that it can return to the Earth's surface at a very distant point (on the order of hundreds of kilometers from the broadcast source. More remarkably some of this radio wave energy bounces off the Earth's surface and reaches the ionosphere for a second time, at a distance even farther away than the first time. Consequently, a high powered transmitter can effectively broadcast over 1000 kilometers by using multiple "skips" off of the ionosphere. And, at times of favorable atmospheric conditions good "skip" occurs, then even a low power transmitter can be heard halfway around the world. This often occurs for "novice" radio amateurs "hams" who are limited by law to transmitters with no more than 65 watts. The Kon-Tiki expedition communicated regularly with a 6 watt transmitter from the middle of the Pacific. For more details see the "communications" part of the "Kon-Tiki expedition" entry in Wikipedia.

An exotic variant of this radio wave propagation has been examined to show that, theoretically, the ionospheric bounce could be greatly exaggerated if a high powered spherical acoustical wave were created in the ionosphere from a source on earth.

== Acoustical diffraction near the Earth's surface ==
In the case of sound waves travelling near the Earth's surface, the waves are diffracted or bent as they traverse by a geometric edge, such as a wall or building. This phenomenon leads to a very important practical effect: that we can hear "around corners". Because of the frequencies involved considerable amount of the sound energy (on the order of ten percent) actually travels into this would be sound "shadow zone". Visible light exhibits a similar effect, but, due to its much shorter wavelength, only a minute amount of light energy travels around a corner.

A useful branch of acoustics dealing with the design of noise barriers examines this acoustical diffraction phenomenon in quantitative detail to calculate the optimum height and placement of a soundwall or berm adjacent to a highway.

This phenomenon is also inherent in calculating the sound levels from aircraft noise, so that an accurate determination of topographic features may be understood. In that way one can produce sound level isopleths, or contour maps, which faithfully depict outcomes over variable terrain.

== See also ==
- Atmospheric refraction
- Noise barrier
