= Corona (optical phenomenon) =

Optical phenomenon of the sky

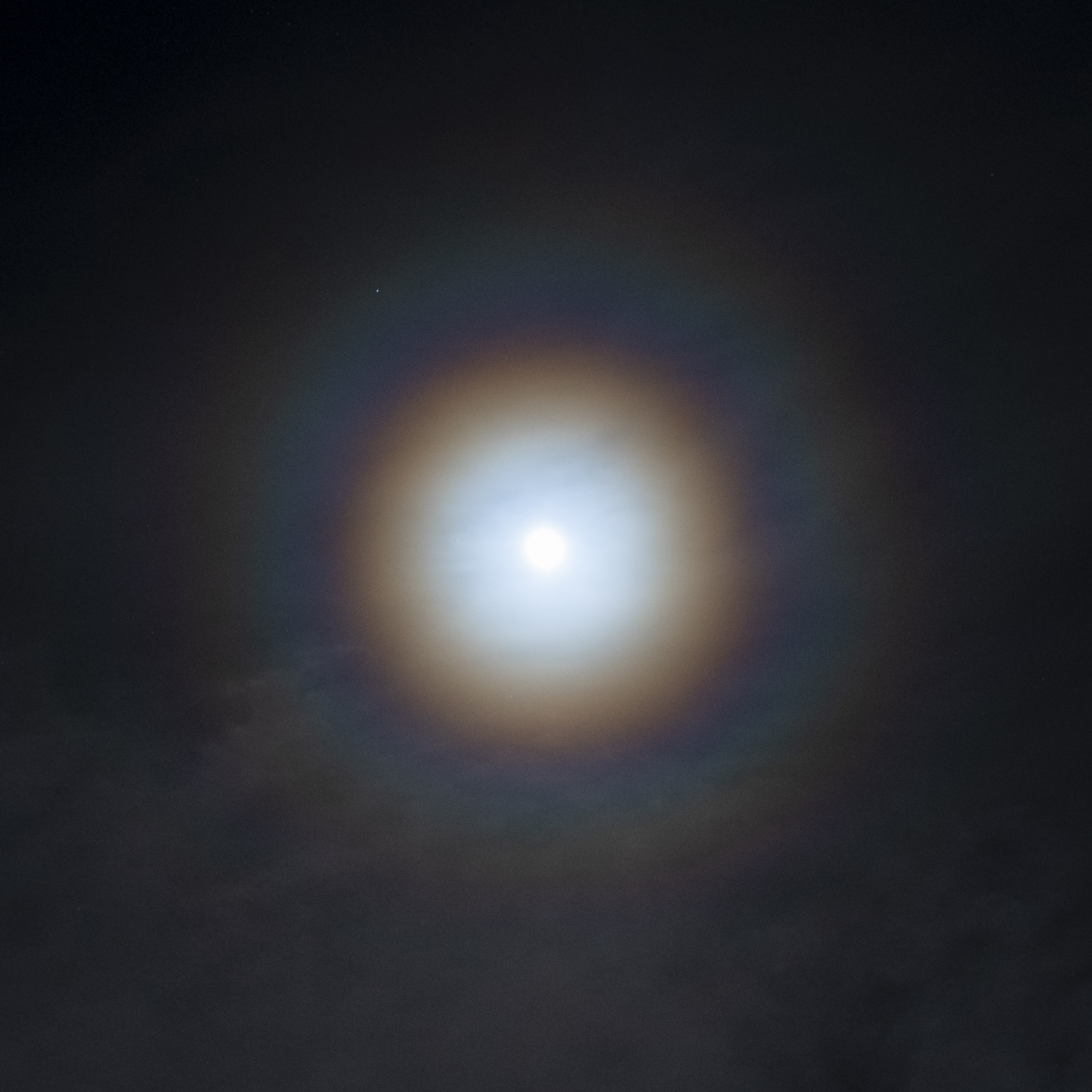
Lunar corona

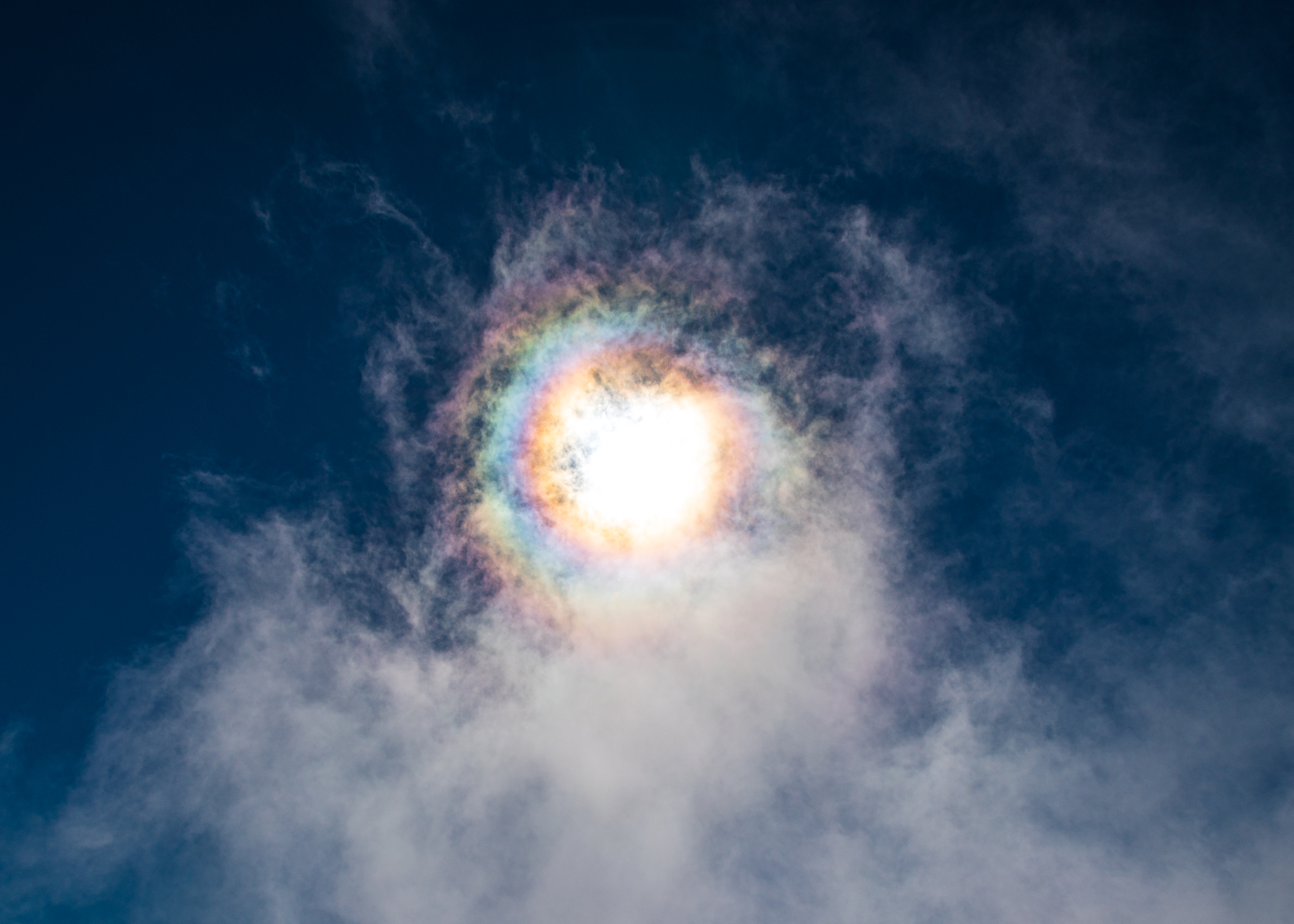
A solar corona up Beinn Mhòr (South Uist)

In meteorology, a corona (plural coronae) is an optical phenomenon and photometeor produced by the diffraction of sunlight or moonlight, or any bright light source by individual particles larger than the wavelength of light, most commonly seen in small water droplets, tiny ice crystals of a cloud, or condensation on a foggy glass surface. In its full form, a corona consists of several concentric, pastel-colored rings around the light source and a central bright area called an aureole. The aureole is often (especially in case of the Moon) the only visible part of the corona and has the appearance of a bluish-white disk which fades to reddish-brown towards the edge. The angular diameter of a corona depends on the sizes of the particles involved relative to the wavelength of light. Smaller particles generally produce larger coronae, while larger particles produce smaller coronae with more closely spaced rings. For the same reason, the corona is the most pronounced when the size of the droplets is most uniform. Coronae differ from halos in that the latter are formed by refraction (rather than diffraction) from comparatively large ice crystals rather than small ice crystals.

The corona intensity pattern resembles an Airy disk, since the diffraction pattern of a round obstacle is identical to that of a round aperture of the same diameter, except for the intensity of the undiffracted light, according to Babinet's principle.

== Mechanism ==
As a wave of light interfaces with a small particle, light traveling at the limbs of the particle will diffract at an angle dependent on the size of the particle and wavelength of light. At some scattering angles, these waves arrive in phase, producing bright zones; at other angles they arrive out of phase, producing dark zones. Combined with other near-forwards scattering effects described by Mie scattering, this gives a diffraction pattern around the forward direction in concentric rings. Using Fraunhofer Diffraction Theory, for a circular particle the Fraunhofer intensity can be written in terms of a Bessel function:

$I(\theta)\propto \left [ \frac{J_1(x\sin\theta)}{x\sin\theta} \right ]^2$

where J_{1} is the Bessel function of the first kind order 1, r is the particle radius, θ is the angular radius of the ring, and x represents the size parameter:

$x=\frac{2\pi r}{\lambda}$

where λ is the wavelength of light in the same units as r. For spherical particles of $r>3\mu m$, the angular radius of the colorful rings is inversely proportional to particle radius.

In visible light, the first three red-colored rings have radii approximately:

${\displaystyle \theta_1 \approx \frac{16}{r},\quad \theta_2 \approx \frac{31}{r},\quad \theta_3 \approx \frac{47}{r}}$

where r is the particle radius in micrometres, and θ is the angular radius of the ring in degrees.

== Cloud iridescence ==
Cloud iridescence is closely related to coronae. Both phenomena arise from the diffraction of light by small particles near a light source and can be observed in thin clouds. When particles are nearly uniform in size over a broad area, their diffraction patterns combine to form a regular circular corona around the light source. When particle sizes vary across a thin cloud, especially near cloud edges, the resulting color may appear as irregular bands or patches known as cloud iridescence.

== Pollen coronae ==
Pollen suspended in the air can also cause diffraction of sunlight that produces coronae. Because pollen grains are not always spherical, the resulting pollen coronae often have characteristic elliptic shape and brighter spots in them. They can be seen during blooming season where there is significant source of pollen like forests. They are more easily seen during sunset or sunrise as there is less sun glare and the light path through pollen laden atmosphere is longer.

== See also ==
- Atmospheric diffraction
- Glory (optical phenomenon)
- Cloud iridescence
- 22° halo

== Gallery ==
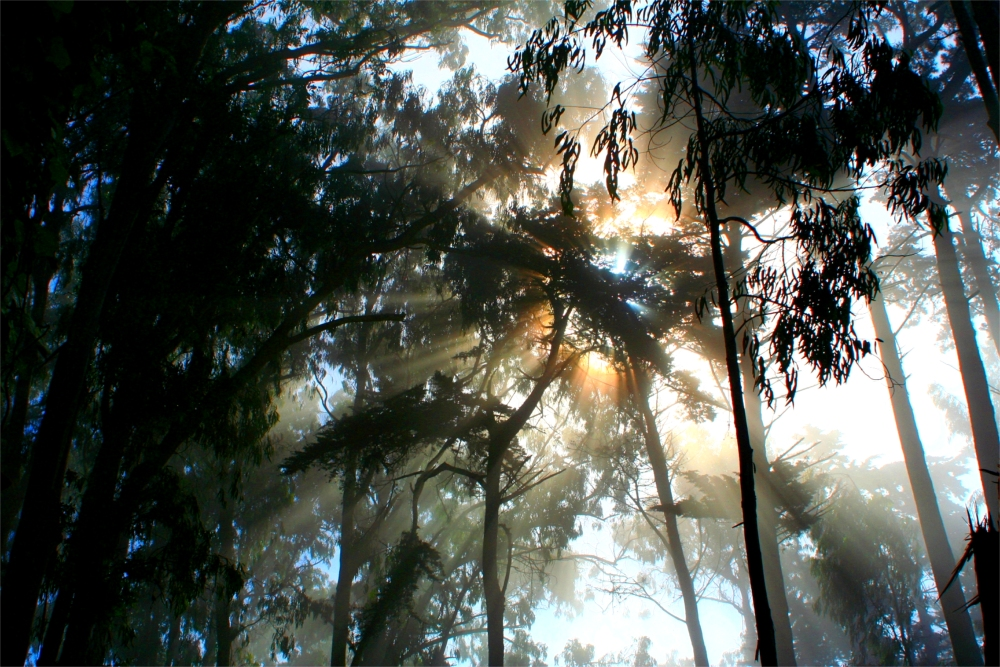
Forest Corona

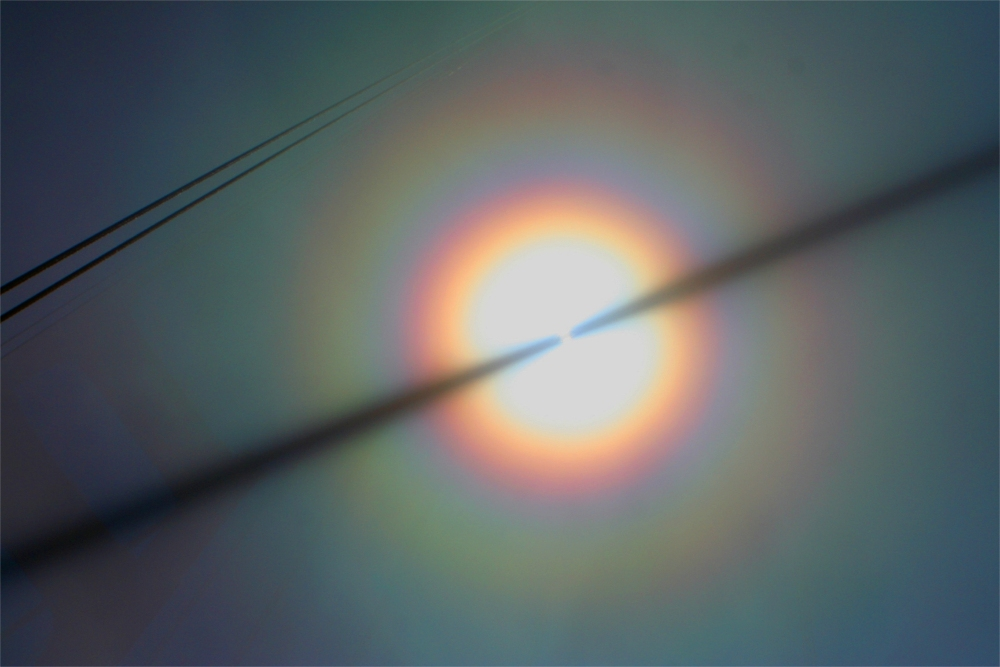
Solar Corona at Golden Gate Bridge

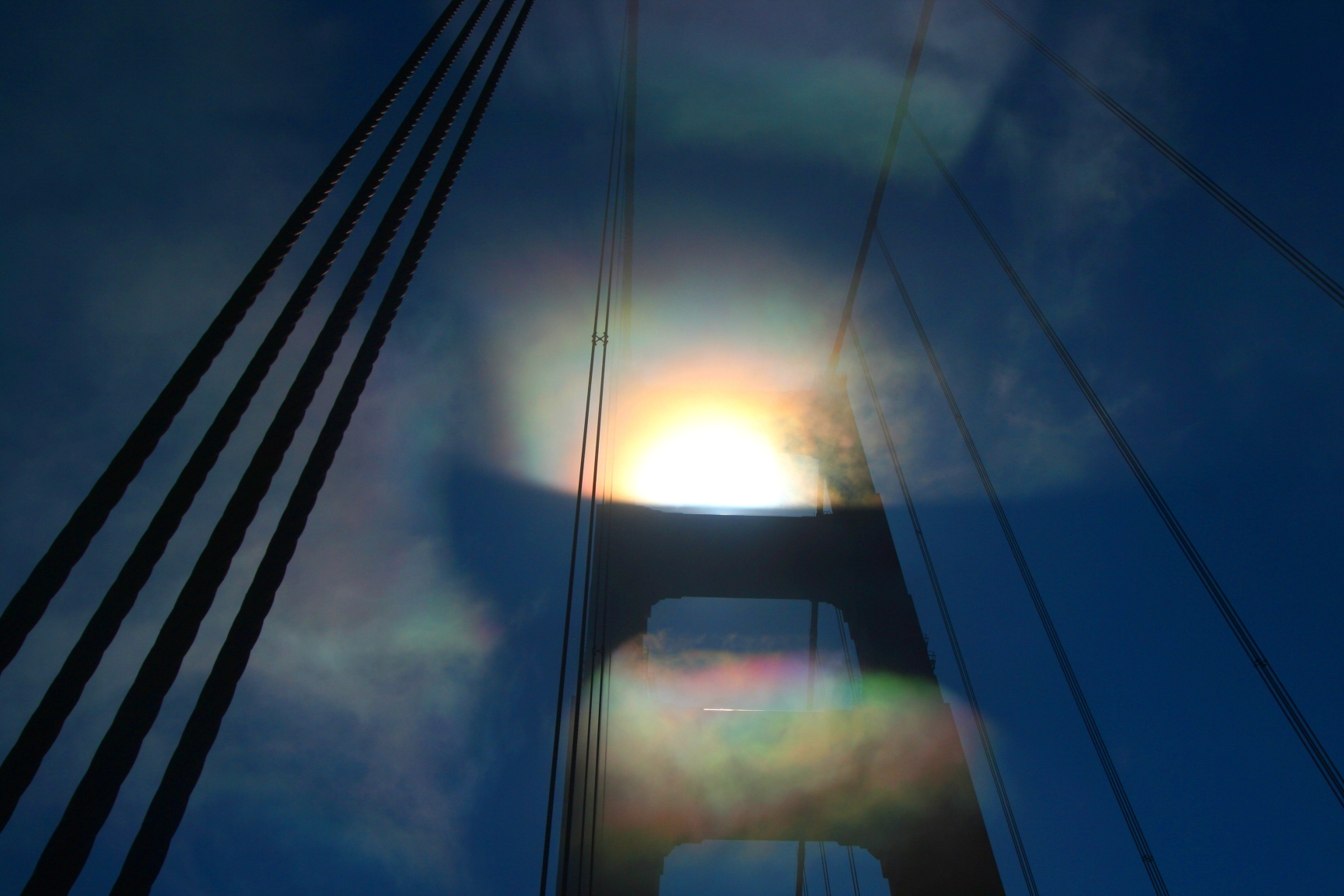
Partial Corona at Golden Gate Bridge

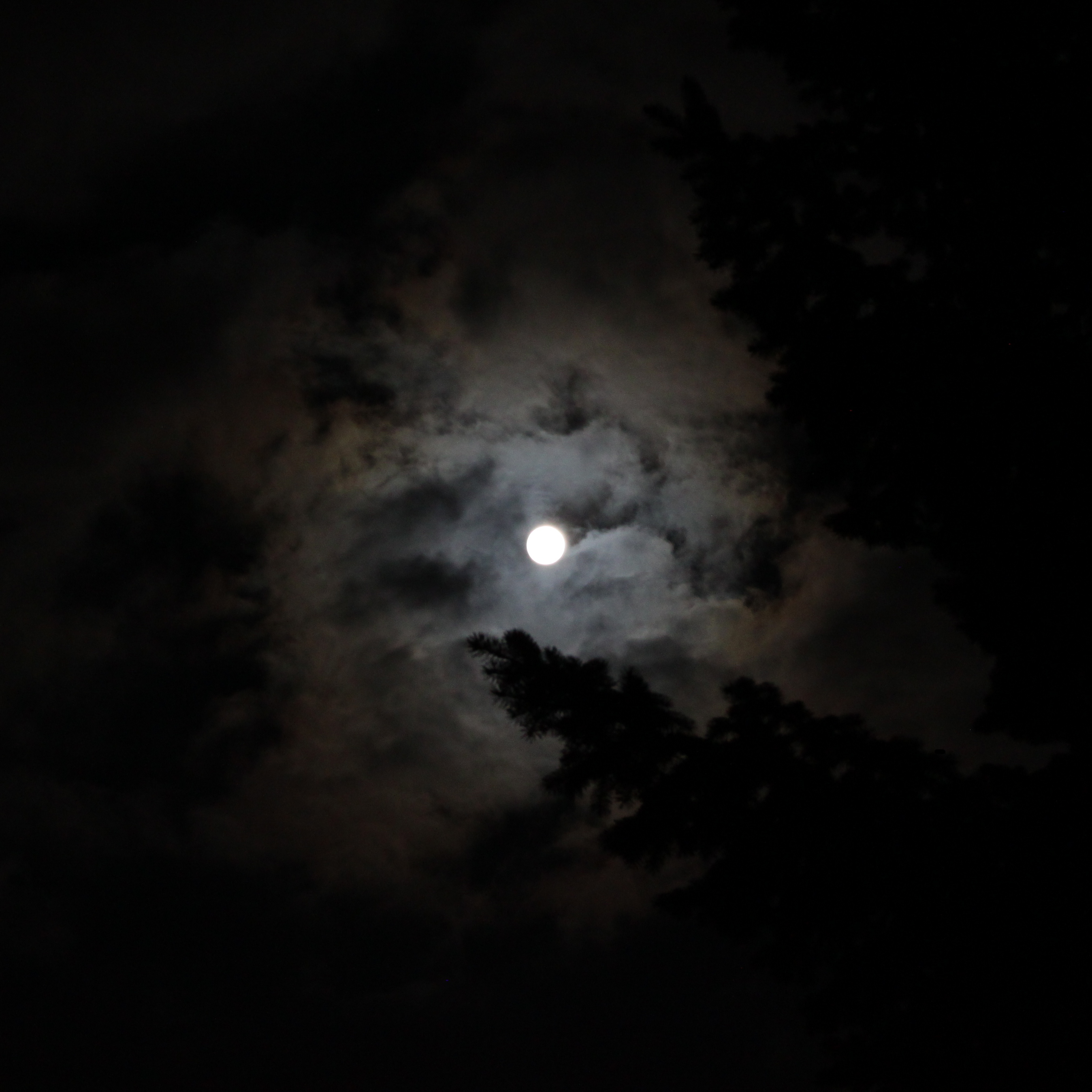
Lunar aureole

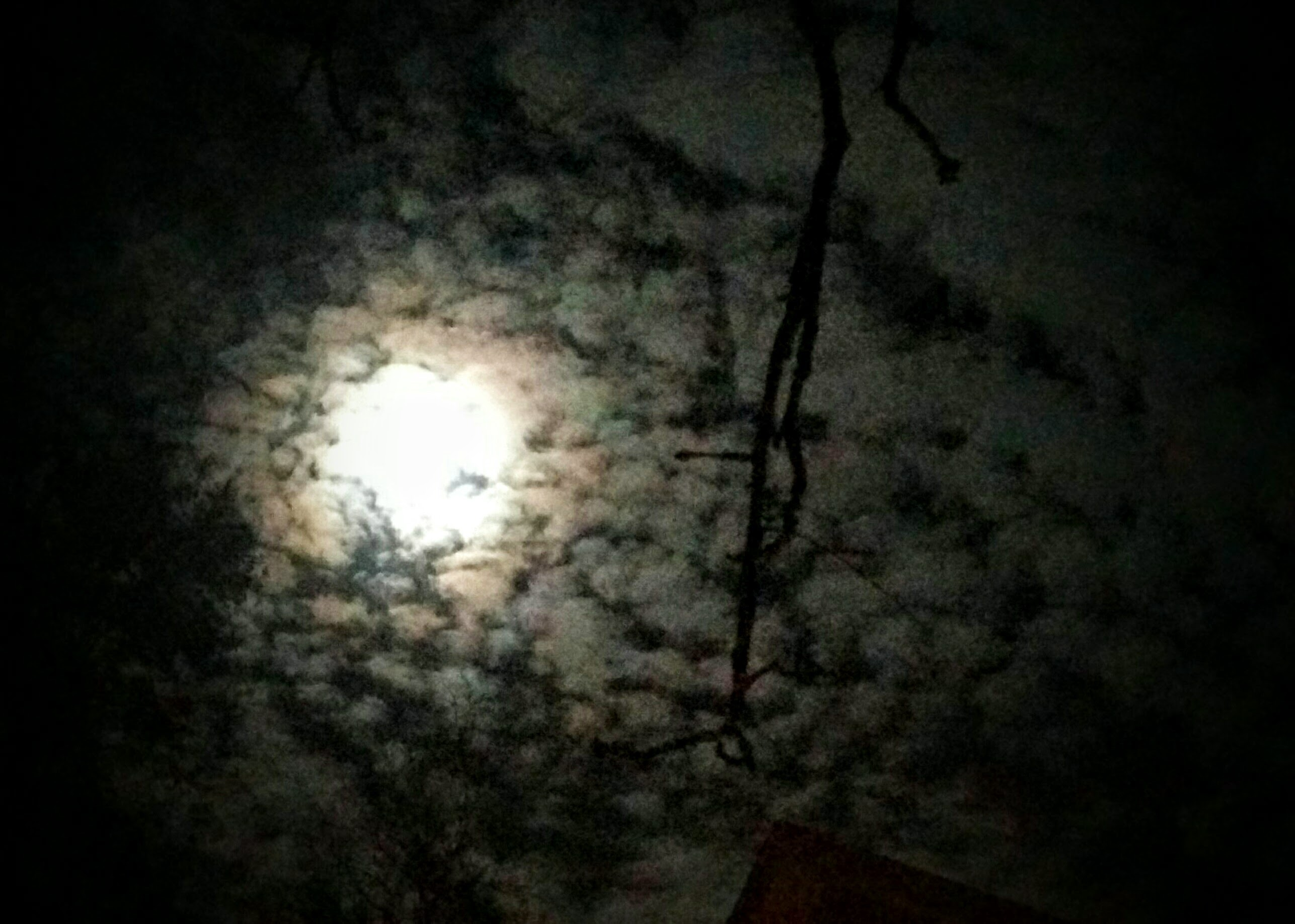
Lunar corona with Altocumulus floccus

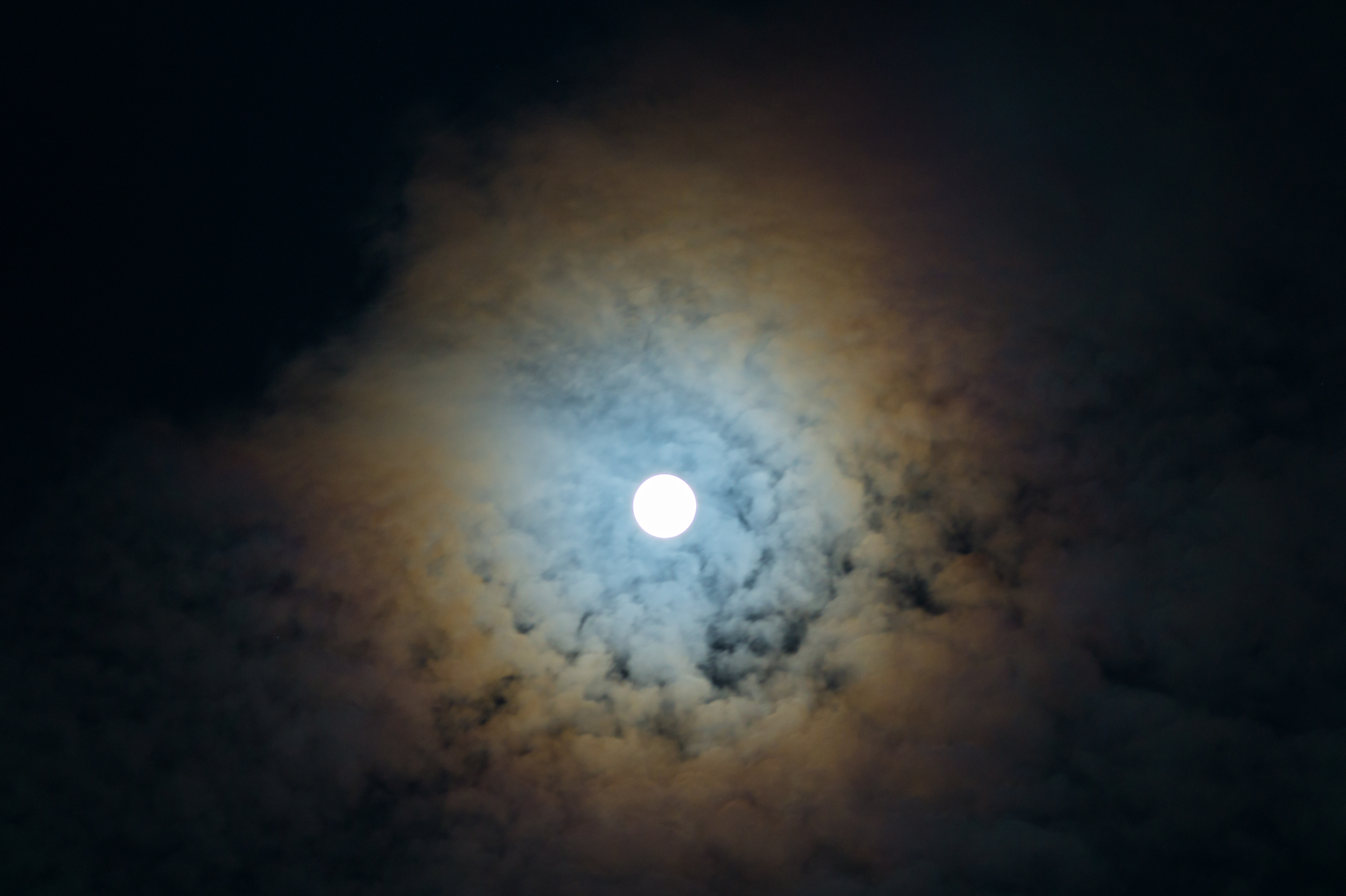
Lunar aureole as seen from Mumbai

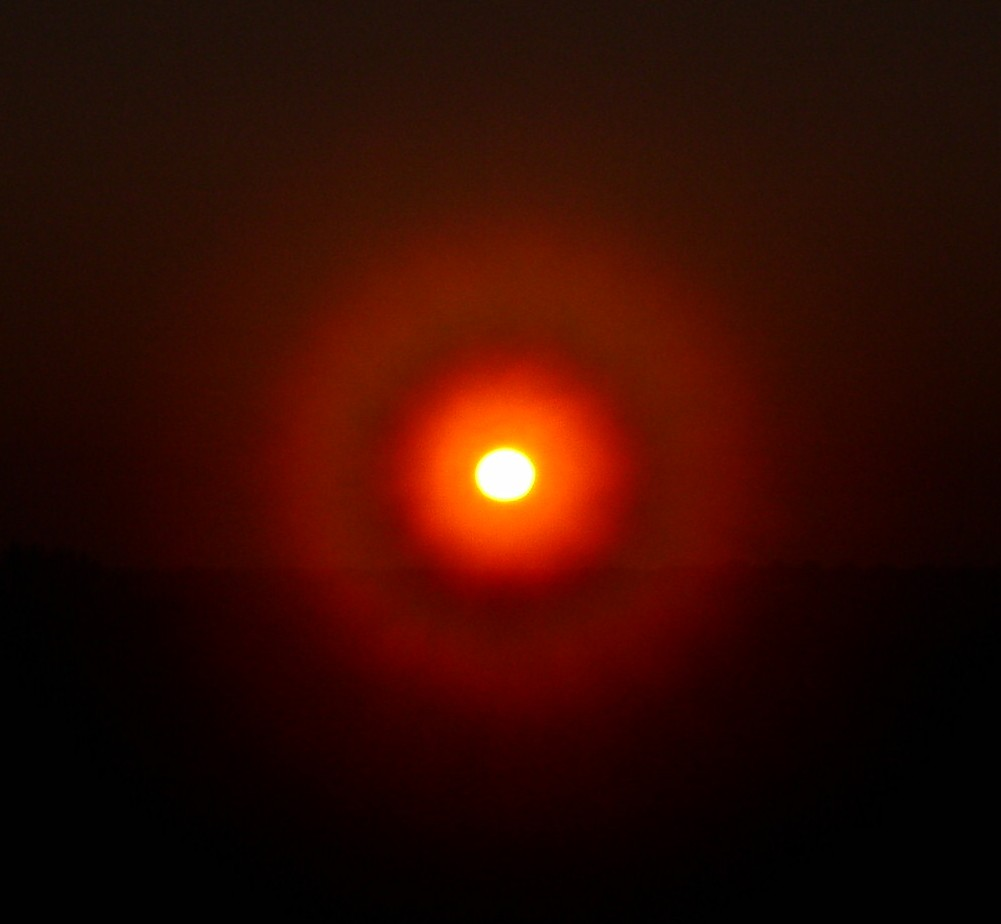
A solar corona soon after sunrise

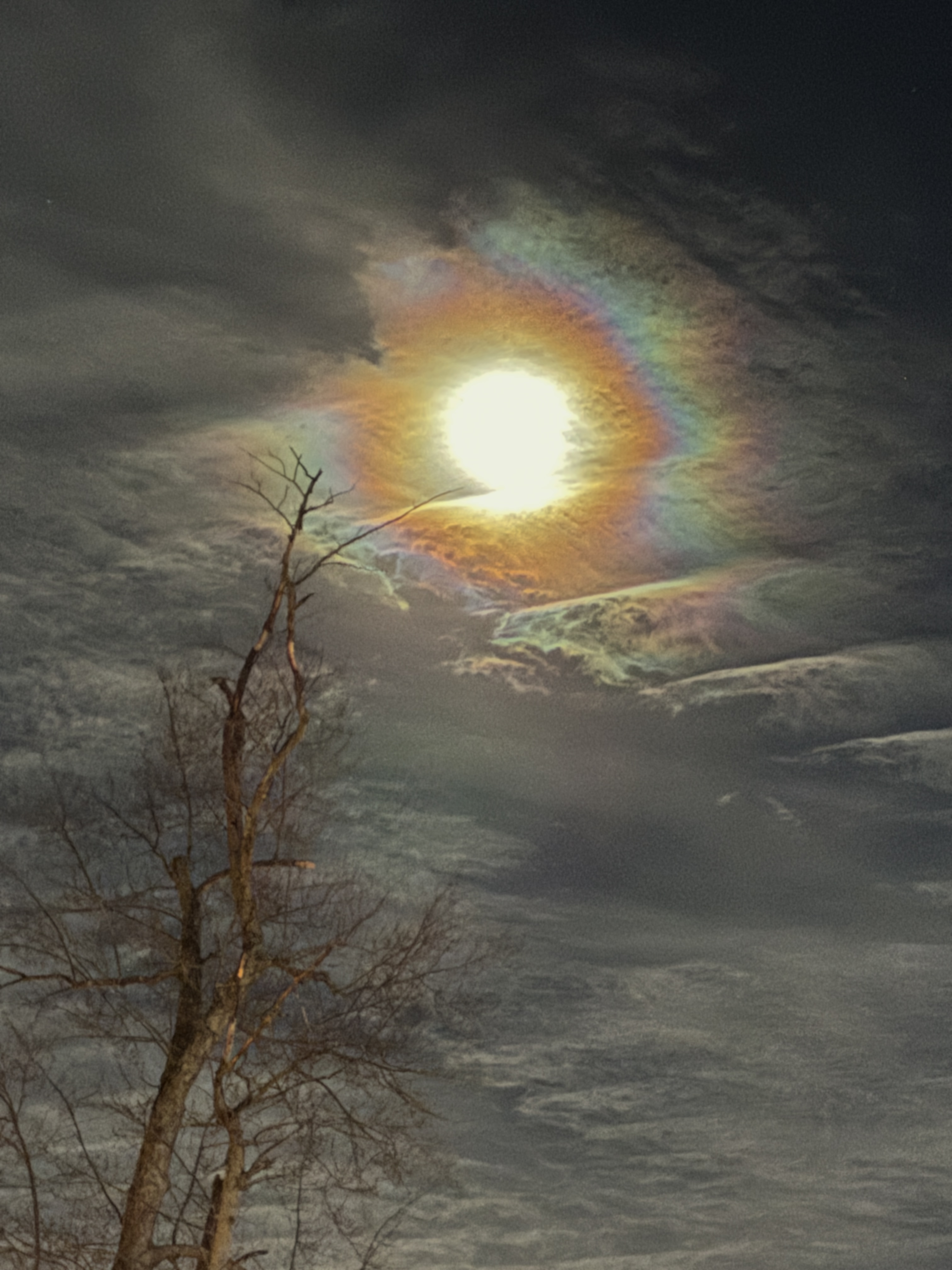
Lunar corona over Cambridge, MA
