= Kinematic diffraction =

Single scattering diffraction

Kinematic diffraction is an approximation for diffraction of waves. It assumes that the waves are only scattered once, neglecting multiple scattering, with no change in the energy of the wave (elastic scattering). For linear wave equations, it involves summing the contribution of the partial waves emanating from different scatterers, where only the incident field drives the scattering.

As a consequence, the far-field amplitude essentially corresponds to the Fourier transform of the scattering length density. This is would be the charge density for x-rays and the electrostatic potential for electrons. It is typically understood as the Born approximation applied to a number of scatterers, and as such is often used for X-ray crystallography. It does need to be combined with an analysis of what directions are allowed by conservation of energy, which is typically down using the Ewald sphere construction. This leads to quite different results depending upon both the wavelength of the waves (which are quite different for electron and x-rays), and the size of the object that scatters the wave. The same approach is sometimes used to model the scattering of acoustic waves, it very general.

The corresponding full theory is called the dynamical theory of diffraction. For x-rays and in electron diffraction different approaches are used for calculating the dynamical diffraction for transmission: with high-energy electrons, for low energy electron diffraction, or reflection high-energy electron diffraction.

== See also ==
- Electron diffraction – Bending of electron beams due to electrostatic interactions with matter
- Neutron diffraction – Technique to investigate atomic structures using neutron scattering
- X-ray diffraction – Elastic interaction of x-rays with electrons
