= Energy-dispersive X-ray diffraction =

Schematic of a typical EDXRD experiment

Energy-dispersive X-ray diffraction (EDXRD) is an analytical technique for characterizing materials. It differs from conventional X-ray diffraction by using polychromatic photons as the source and is usually operated at a fixed angle. With no need for a goniometer, EDXRD is able to collect full diffraction patterns very quickly. EDXRD is almost exclusively used with synchrotron radiation which allows for measurement within real engineering materials.

Sample data from an EDXRD experiment where synchrotron radiation is utilized. Spectra can be generated rapidly and as a function of position or time.

== History ==
EDXRD was originally proposed independently by Buras et al. and Giessen and Gordon in 1968.

== Advantages ==
The advantages of EDXRD are (1) it uses a fixed scattering angle, (2) it works directly in reciprocal space, (3) fast collection time, and (4) parallel data collection. The fixed scattering angle geometry makes EDXRD especially suitable for in situ studies in special environments (e.g. under very low or high temperatures and pressures). When the EDXRD method is used, only one entrance and one exit window are needed. The fixed scattering angle also allows for measurement of the diffraction vector directly. This allows for high-accuracy measurement of lattice parameters. It allows for rapid structure analysis and the ability to study materials that are unstable and only exist for short periods of time. Because the whole spectrum of diffracted radiation is obtained simultaneously, it enables parallel data collection studies where structural changes can be determined over time.

== Facilities ==
Facility	Location	Beamline	Energy range (keV)
National Synchrotron Light Source	Upton, NY	X17B1	50–200
Advanced Photon Source	Argonne, IL	16-BM-B	10–120
German Electron Synchrotron	Hamburg, DE	P61B	50–150
Cornell High Energy Synchrotron Source	Ithaca, NY	B1	unknown
Diamond Light Source	Oxfordshire, UK	I12	50–150
SOLEIL	Paris, France	I03c	15–100
Indus 2	India	BL-11	unknown
