= Franz Pfeiffer =

Franz Pfeiffer may refer to:

- Franz Pfeiffer (literary scholar) (1815–1868), Swiss literary scholar
- Franz Pfeiffer (physicist) (born 1972), German physicist
- Franz Pfeiffer (officer), German Wehrmacht officer
- Franz Georg Pfeiffer (1784–1856), German legal scholar and politician

== See also ==
- Franz Pfeffer von Salomon (1888–1968), or Franz von Pfeffer, Nazi leader
