= Single-shot multi-contrast X-ray imaging =

Single-shot multi-contrast x-ray imaging is an efficient and a robust x-ray imaging technique which is used to obtain three different and complementary types of information, i.e. absorption, scattering, and phase contrast from a single exposure of x-rays on a detector subsequently utilizing Fourier analysis/technique. Absorption is mainly due to the attenuation and Compton scattering from the object, while phase contrast corresponds to phase shift of x-rays.

The technique obtain images from the biological and non-biological objects. The research purposes include radiography, scattering imaging, differential phase contrast, and diffraction imaging. It is also possible to adjust and modify the experiment based on what information is of most importance. Almost every application that utilize this technique have the same approach, mathematics and science behind it such as the experimental setup, complementary information and Fourier analysis.

Single-shot multi-contrast x-ray imaging gained its importance recently in contrast to Talbot–Lau interferometer because of the less optical element such as diffraction gratings being used under it and hence obtaining every information digitally.
