= Atsushi Momose =

Japanese physicist

- Born: 1962 (age 63–64); Toyama Prefecture, Japan
- Education: University of Tokyo
- Known for: Grating-based Phase-contrast X-ray imaging
- Awards: 22nd Optical and Quantum Electronics Achievement Award (2021)
- Scientific career
- Fields: Physics
- Workplaces: Tohoku University; University of Tokyo

Atsushi Momose (百生敦, Momose Atsushi) is a Japanese physicist and professor at Tohoku University known for his contributions to the field of phase-contrast X-ray imaging.

== Biography ==
Born in 1962 in Toyama Prefecture, Momose graduated with a Master's degree in Engineering from The University of Tokyo in 1987. Between 1987 and 1999, he worked at the Hitachi's Advanced Research Laboratory. During this time he completed his doctoral degree. 1997-1998 he worked one year at the synchrotron facility ESRF in Grenoble, France. In 1999, he was appointed associate professor at the department of applied physics at The University of Tokyo. In 2003, he was appointed associate professor at the Graduate School of Frontier Science. In 2012, he was appointed full professor at Tohoku University in Sendai.

== Research ==
Momose is mainly known for his work on grating-based phase-contrast X-ray imaging. He was the first to show that this could be accomplish in a Talbot setup with two gratings and a detector. He was also one of the first to show grating-based imaging in combination with tomography.

== Awards ==
- 2021 22nd Optical and Quantum Electronics Achievement Award (Hiroshi Takuma Award) from the Japan Society of Applied Physics
