= Talbot cavity =

A Talbot cavity is an external cavity used for the coherent beam combination of output from laser sets. It has been used experimentally for semiconductor laser diodes, carbon dioxide lasers, fiber lasers and solid-state disk lasers arranged in an array. In the simplest version, it is constructed with a single mirror at half the Talbot distance from the output facet of the laser array:

$z_{_\text{T}}=\frac{2p^2}{\lambda},$

where $p$ is the period of the laser lattice and $\lambda$ is the wavelength of laser emission. The constructive interference images the near field of the array back onto the array itself at the Talbot distance, creating optical feedback. This interference feedback forces the lasers in the array to transverse mode lock. The Fresnel number $F$ of the $N-$ element laser array phase-locked by Talbot cavity is given by:

$F=(N-1)^2.$

Talbot beam combination is highly sensitive to transverse phase distortions even at $\lambda / 10$ scale. Theory developed for Talbot cavities facilitated the development of thin disk diode-pumped solid-state laser arrays.
