= Franz Pfeiffer (physicist) =

German physicist

- Born: 25 November 1972; Kösching, Germany
- Education: Saarland University; LMU Munich
- Known for: Grating-based phase-contrast X-ray imaging Dark-field imaging
- Awards: Leibniz Prize (2011)
- Scientific career
- Fields: Physics
- Workplaces: Technical University of Munich; EPFL; Swiss Light Source

Franz Pfeiffer (born 25 November 1972 in Kösching, Germany) is a German physicist known for his contributions to the development of Phase-contrast X-ray imaging and its applications in biomedical research.

== Research ==
Pfeiffer contributed to the extension of known imaging modalities such as Differential interference contrast microscopy and Dark-field microscopy to the X-ray regime. In 2006, he demonstrated the feasibility of phase sensitive X-ray imaging with conventional, polychromatic X-ray sources and a grating interferometer. This enlarged the potential of X-ray phase imaging for clinical use as before the technique was only possible at synchrotron facilities. Pfeiffer further introduced the extraction of a supplementary signal (so-called "dark-field signal") sensitive to porous microstructure of a sample based on X-ray scattering. His research group at the Technical University of Munich demonstrated a range of possible applications of the new modalities in medical and material research.

Further Pfeiffer is known for his research in X-ray Ptychography, X-ray tensor tomography, grating-based Neutron interferometric imaging and iterative CT reconstruction algorithms. He is author and co-author of more than 250 scientific publications and inventor in several patents.

In 2011, he was awarded the Leibniz Prize for his achievements in X-ray physics.
