= Talbot effect =

Near-field diffraction effect

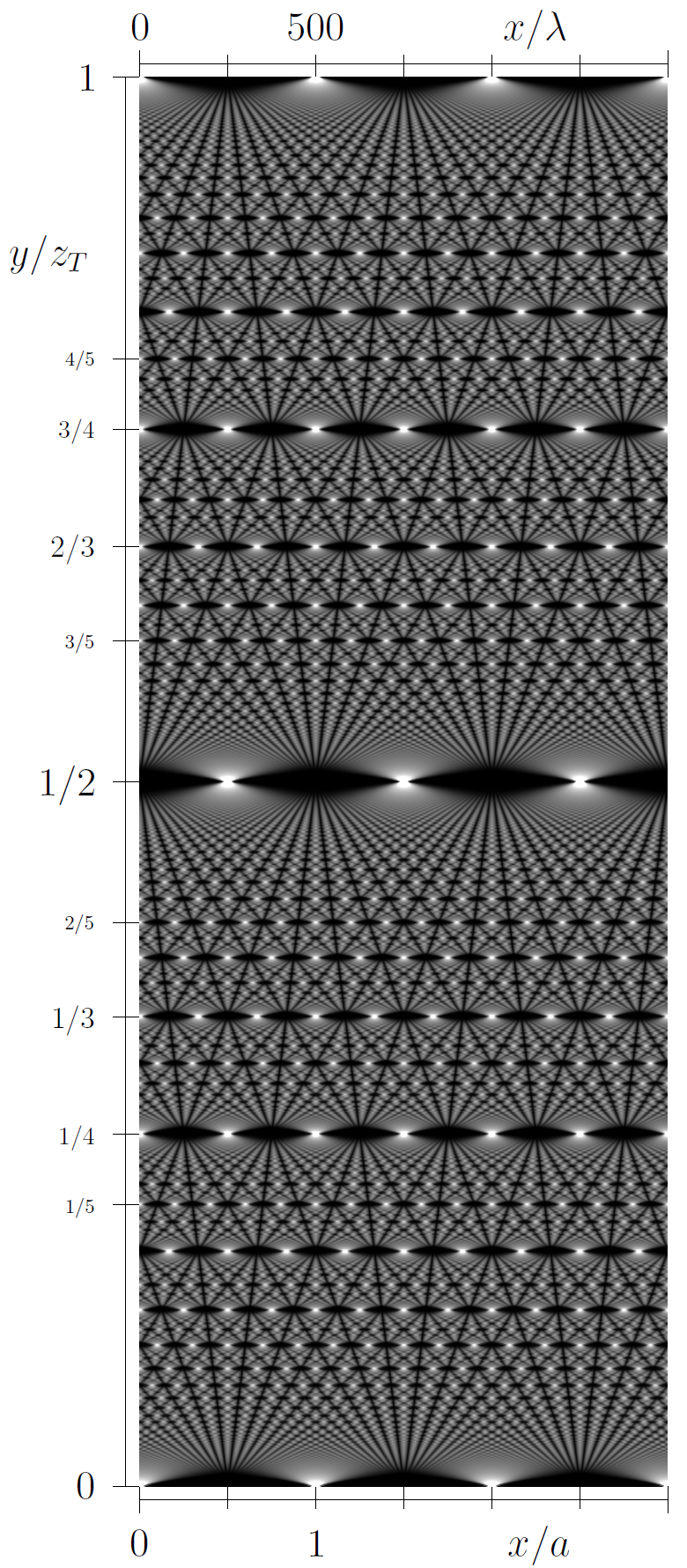
The optical Talbot effect for monochromatic light, shown as a "Talbot carpet". At the bottom of the figure the light can be seen diffracting through a grating, and this pattern is reproduced at the top of the picture (one Talbot length away from the grating). At regular fractions of the Talbot length the sub-images form.

The Talbot effect is a diffraction effect first observed in 1836 by Henry Fox Talbot. When a plane wave is incident upon a periodic diffraction grating, the image of the grating is repeated at regular distances away from the grating plane. The regular distance is called the Talbot length, and the repeated images are called self images or Talbot images. Furthermore, at half the Talbot length, a self-image also occurs, but phase-shifted by half a period (the physical meaning of this is that it is laterally shifted by half the width of the grating period). At smaller regular fractions of the Talbot length, sub-images can also be observed. At one quarter of the Talbot length, the self-image is halved in size, and appears with half the period of the grating (thus twice as many images are seen). At one eighth of the Talbot length, the period and size of the images is halved again, and so forth creating a fractal pattern of sub images with ever-decreasing size, often referred to as a Talbot carpet. Talbot cavities are used for coherent beam combination of laser sets.

== Calculation of the Talbot length ==
Lord Rayleigh showed that the Talbot effect was a natural consequence of Fresnel diffraction and that the Talbot length can be found by the following formula (page 204):

$$z_\text{T} = \frac{\lambda}{1 - \sqrt{ 1 - \frac{\lambda^2}{a^2} }},$$

where $a$ is the period of the diffraction grating and $\lambda$ is the wavelength of the light incident on the grating. For $\lambda \ll a$, the Talbot length is approximately given by:

$$z_\text{T} \approx \frac{2a^2}{\lambda}.$$

=== Fresnel number of the finite size Talbot grating ===
The number of Fresnel zones $N_\text{F}$ that form first Talbot self-image of the grating with period $p$ and transverse size $N \cdot p$ is given by exact formula $N_\text{F} = (N-1)^2$. This result is obtained via exact evaluation of Fresnel-Kirchhoff integral in the near field at distance $z_\text{T} = \frac{2 p^2}{\lambda}$.

== Atomic Talbot effect ==
Due to the quantum mechanical wave nature of particles, diffraction effects have also been observed with atoms—effects which are similar to those in the case of light. Chapman et al. carried out an experiment in which a collimated beam of sodium atoms was passed through two diffraction gratings (the second used as a mask) to observe the Talbot effect and measure the Talbot length. The beam had a mean velocity of 1000 m/s corresponding to a de Broglie wavelength of $\lambda_\text{dB}$ = 0.017 nm. Their experiment was performed with 200 and 300 nm gratings which yielded Talbot lengths of 4.7 and 10.6 mm respectively. This showed that for an atomic beam of constant velocity, by using $\lambda_\text{dB}$, the atomic Talbot length can be found in the same manner.

== Nonlinear Talbot effect ==
The nonlinear Talbot effect results from self-imaging of the generated periodic intensity pattern at the output surface of the periodically poled LiTaO_{3} crystal. Both integer and fractional nonlinear Talbot effects were investigated.

In cubic nonlinear Schrödinger's equation $i\frac{\partial \psi}{\partial z} + \frac{1}{2} \frac{\partial^2 \psi}{\partial x^2} + |\psi|^2 \psi = 0$, nonlinear Talbot effect of rogue waves is observed numerically.

The nonlinear Talbot effect was also realized in linear, nonlinear and highly nonlinear surface gravity water waves. In the experiment, the group observed that higher frequency periodic patterns at the fractional Talbot distance disappear. Further increase in the wave steepness lead to deviations from the established nonlinear theory, unlike in the periodic revival that occurs in the linear and nonlinear regime, in highly nonlinear regimes the wave crests exhibit self acceleration, followed by self deceleration at half the Talbot distance, thus completing a smooth transition of the periodic pulse train by half a period.

== Applications of the optical Talbot effect ==
The optical Talbot effect can be used in imaging applications to overcome the diffraction limit (e.g. in structured illumination fluorescence microscopy).

Moreover, its capacity to generate very fine patterns is also a powerful tool in Talbot lithography.

The Talbot cavity is used for the phase-locking of the laser sets.

In experimental fluid dynamics, the Talbot effect has been implemented in Talbot interferometry to measure displacements and temperature, and deployed with laser-induced fluorescence to reconstruct free surfaces in 3D, and measure velocity.

== See also ==
- Angle-sensitive pixel
