= Coherent addition =

Method of laser power scaling

Coherent addition (or coherent combining) of lasers is a method of power scaling. It allows increasing the output power and brightness of single-transversal mode laser.

Usually, the term coherent addition applies to fiber lasers. As the ability of pumping and/or cooling of a single laser is saturated, several similar lasers can be forced to oscillate in phase with a common coupler. The first nonlinear theory of the coherent addition of laser sets had been developed by Nikolay Basov with co-workers in 1965. For Nd:YAG laser set beam combination had been realized by means of SBS phase conjugating mirror. The coherent addition was demonstrated in power scaling of Raman lasers.

Fig.1. Example of the coherent addition of 4 fiber lasers with a common coupler.

== Limits of coherent addition ==
The addition of lasers reduces the number of longitudinal modes in the output beam; the more lasers are combined, the smaller is the number of longitudinal modes in the output. The simple estimates show that the number of output modes reduces exponentially with the number of lasers combined. Of order of eight lasers can be combined in such a way. The future increase of number of combined lasers requires the exponential growth of the spectral bandwidth of gain and/or length of partial lasers. The same conclusion can be made also on the base of more detailed simulations. Practically, the combination of more than ten lasers with a passive combining arrangement appears to be difficult. However, active coherent combining of lasers has the potential to scale to very large numbers of channels.

== Nonlinear coherent addition of lasers ==
Nonlinear interactions of light waves are used widely to synchronize the laser beams in multichannel optical systems. Self-adjusting of phases may be robustly achievable in binary-tree array of beam-splitters and degenerate four-wave mixing Kerr Phase conjugation in Chirped pulse amplification extreme light facilities. This phase-conjugating Michelson interferometer increases the brightness as $N^2$, where $N$ is the number of phase-locked channels.

== Talbot coherent addition ==
Constructive interference due to Talbot self-imaging forces the lasers in the array to transverse mode locking. The Fresnel number $F$ of the one-dimensional $N-$ element laser array phase-locked by Talbot cavity is given by $F=N^2.$ For the two-dimensional $N^2-$ element laser array phase-locked by Talbot cavity Fresnel number $F$ scales as $F=N^2$ as well. Talbot phase-locking techniques are applicable to thin disk diode-pumped solid-state laser arrays.

== Field applications of beam combination ==
Laser beam combination of a dozens fiber laser via multispectral technique at 50 kW output power level had been implemented in Dragonfire (weapon) laser system with promising deployment at onboard future Royal Navy warships, British Army armoured vehicles and fighter aircraft of the Royal Air Force, including the BAE Systems Tempest.

- List of laser articles
