= Jianwei Miao =

Chinese-American physicist

Jianwei (John) Miao
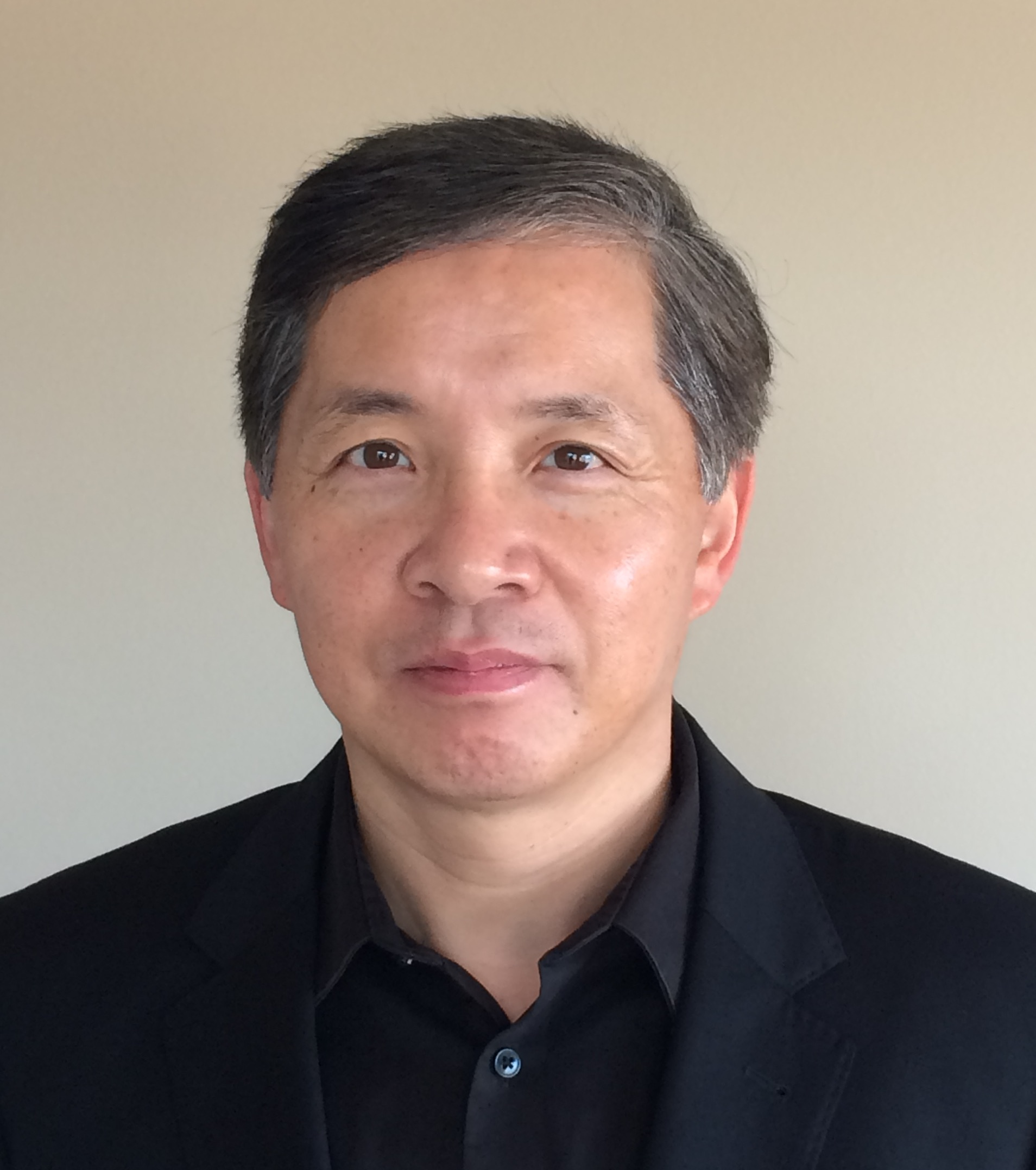
- Born: November 1969 (age 56–57); Hangzhou, China
- Education: Hangzhou University (now Zhejiang University) (BS, 1991); Chinese Academy of Sciences(MS, 1994); State University of New York at Stony Brook(PhD, 1999)
- Known for: Coherent Diffractive Imaging; Atomic Electron Tomography; 3D atomic structure of amorphous solids
- Scientific career
- Fields: Physics, Materials science, Microscopy
- Workplaces: SLAC National Accelerator Laboratory, Stanford University (2000 – 2004); University of California, Los Angeles (2004 – present)
- Doctoral advisor: David Sayre, Janos Kirz
- Website: https://www.physics.ucla.edu/research/imaging

Jianwei (John) Miao is a Professor of Physics and Astronomy at the University of California, Los Angeles and a member of the California NanoSystems Institute. He pioneered computational microscopy by unifying crystallography and microscopy through coherent diffraction and algorithms, replacing lenses with computation. In 1999, he demonstrated the first experimental coherent diffractive imaging (CDI), which laid the foundation for modern ptychography and reshaped nanoscale and atomic-scale structural measurement across synchrotron radiation, X-ray free electron lasers, high-harmonic generation, optical microscopy, and electron microscopy.

In 2012, Miao applied the CDI method to pioneer Atomic Electron Tomography (AET), enabling the first determination of 3D atomic structures without assuming crystallinity or averaging. In 2025, he published a single-author review article in Nature titled "Computational microscopy with coherent diffractive imaging and ptychography", which encapsulates 25 years of advancements in computational imaging that have fundamentally transformed the field of microscopy.

== Career ==
Miao received a BS in physics from Hangzhou University (now Zhejiang University) in 1991, and an MS in physics from the Institute of High Energy Physics, Chinese Academy of Sciences in 1994. He then moved to the U.S. and received a PhD in physics, an M.S. in computer science, and an advanced graduate certificate in biomedical engineering from the State University of New York at Stony Brook in 1999. After obtaining his PhD, Miao became a staff scientist in the Stanford Synchrotron Radiation Lightsource at the SLAC National Accelerator Laboratory. In 2004, he moved to UCLA as an assistant professor and was promoted to full professor in 2009. He has served as the Deputy Director of the STROBE NSF Science and Technology Center since 2016. In 2026, Miao became a member of the Board on Physics of the National Academies of Sciences, Engineering, and Medicine.

== Research ==
Miao pioneered the development of novel imaging methods using x-rays and electrons, and contributed to theory, computation, and experiment. He proposed the oversampling ratio concept in 1998, which explains under what conditions the phase problem of non-crystalline specimens can be solved. In 1999, he conducted the first CDI experiment at the National Synchrotron Light Source, Brookhaven National Laboratory. CDI methods, such as conventional CDI, ptychography (i.e., scanning CDI) and Bragg CDI, have been broadly implemented using synchrotron radiation, x-ray free electron lasers, high harmonic generation, electron and optical microscopy. It has also become one of the justifications for the construction of x-ray free electron lasers worldwide.

In 2012, Miao applied CDI phase retrieval algorithms to tomography and demonstrated AET at 2.4 Å resolution without assuming crystallinity. He then applied AET to observe nearly all the atoms in a Pt nanoparticle, and imaged the 3D core structure of edge and screw dislocations at atomic resolution. In 2015, he determined the 3D coordinates of thousands of individual atoms in a material with a 3D precision of 19 pm and addressed Richard Feynman's 1959 challenge. Later, Miao measured the 3D coordinates of more than 23,000 atoms in an FePt nanoparticle, and correlated chemical order/disorder and crystal defects with material properties at the single-atom level. In 2019, he developed 4D AET to observe crystal nucleation at atomic resolution, showing early stage nucleation results contradict classical nucleation theory. Miao also demonstrated scanning AET (sAET) to correlate the 3D atomic defects and electronic properties of 2D materials. In 2021, he determined for the first time the 3D atomic structure of amorphous solids and observed the medium-range order in amorphous materials.

== Awards ==
- 1999 Werner Meyer-Ilse Memorial Award
- 2006 Alfred P. Sloan Research Fellow
- 2010 Kavli Frontiers Fellow
- 2013 Theodore von Kármán Fellowship, RWTH Aachen University, Germany
- 2015 University of Strasbourg Institute for Advanced Study (USIAS) Fellowship, France.
- 2016 Fellow, American Physical Society
- 2018 Special NSF Creativity Award
- 2021 Innovation in Materials Characterization Award, Materials Research Society
- 2025 Fellow, Materials Research Society
- 2026 Joseph F. Keithley Award For Advances in Measurement Science, American Physical Society
