= Computational microscopy =

Algorithmic imaging methods that reconstruct quantitative phase and amplitude

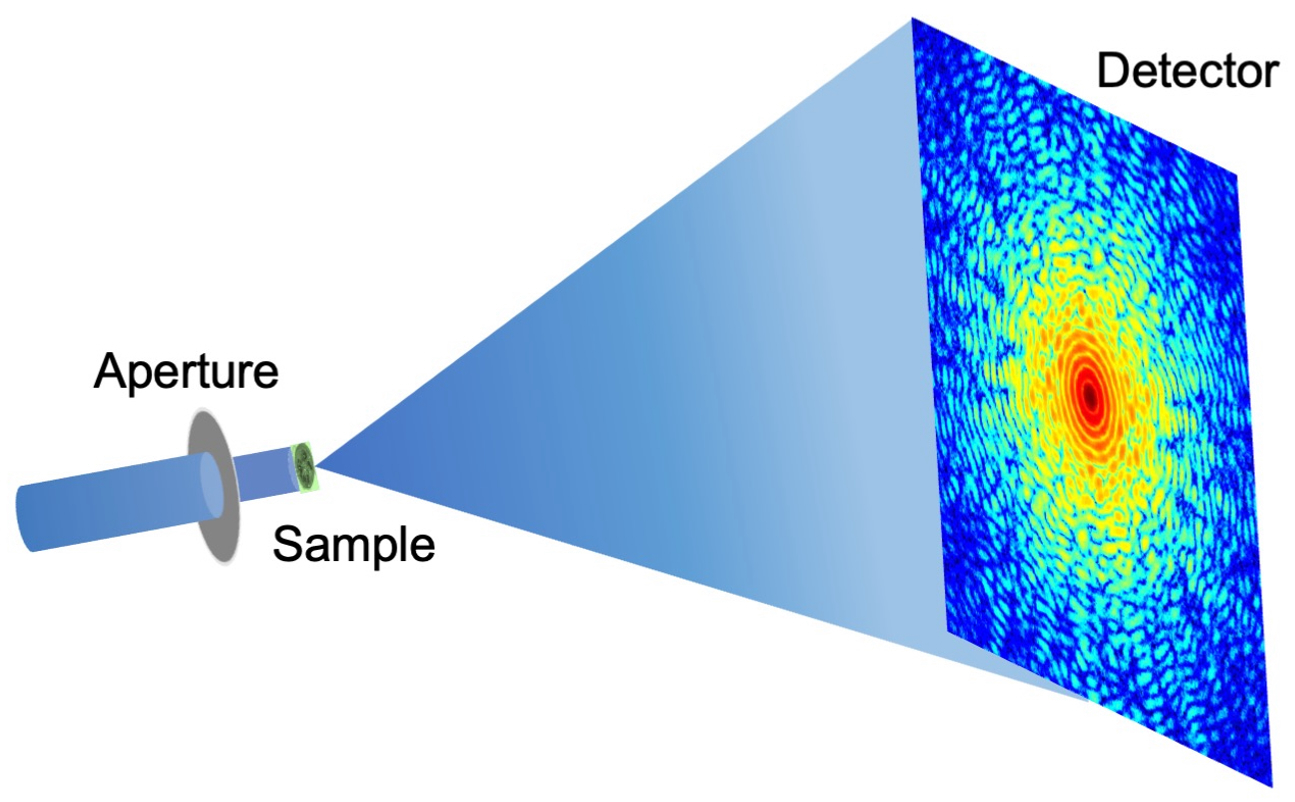
CDI: A coherent wave illuminates a sample and the detector records an oversampled diffraction pattern.

Computational microscopy combines tailored illumination, coherent scattering, and algorithmic reconstruction to generate quantitative 2D and 3D images spanning length scales from ångströms to centimeters. The field unifies the principles of microscopy and crystallography by replacing or augmenting optical components with phase-retrieval and computational algorithms. Major approaches include coherent diffractive imaging (CDI), ptychography (X-ray and electron), and Fourier ptychography (optical). Together they achieve record spatial resolution, wide fields of view, and quantitative phase contrast across applications ranging from materials and quantum systems to biological imaging and device metrology.

== Definition and scope ==
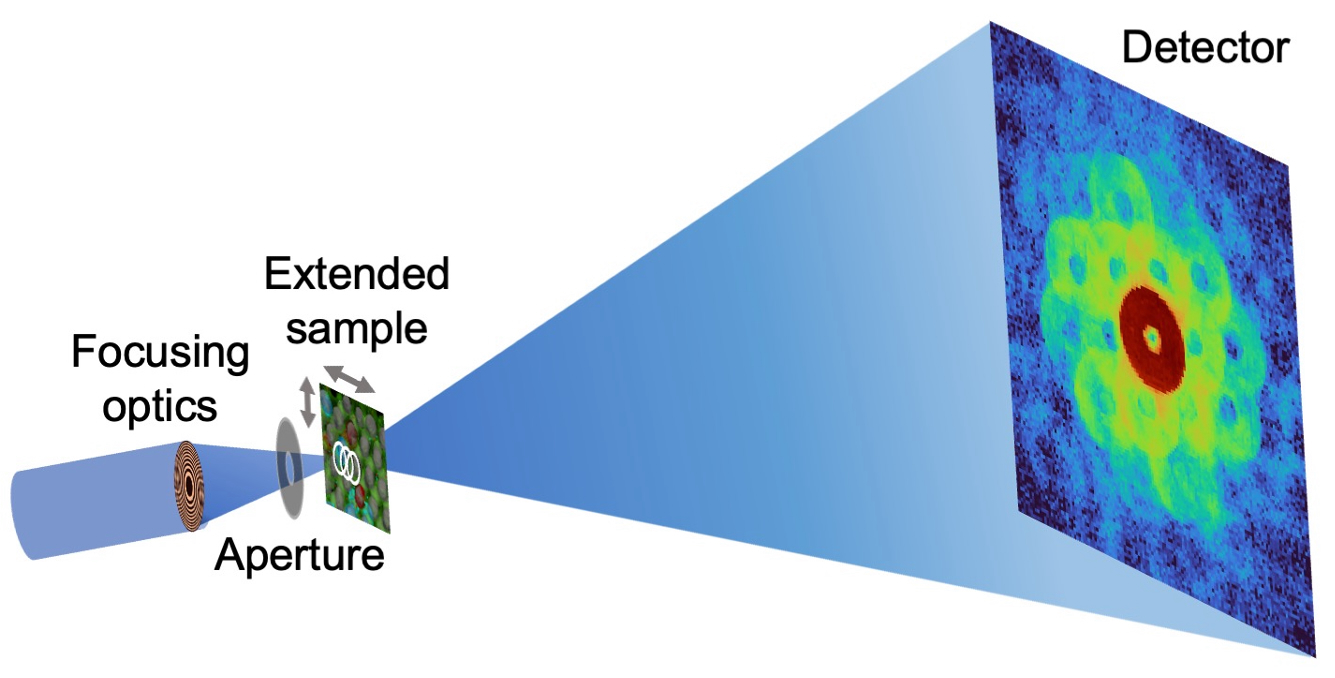
X-ray ptychographic CDI. An X-ray probe raster-scans an extended sample, with each probe overlapping the adjacent ones, and a detector records the diffraction pattern at each scan position.

Computational microscopy refers to imaging modalities in which raw measurements (often diffraction patterns or image stacks under diverse illuminations) are transformed into sample transmission functions—amplitude and phase—via iterative or learned reconstruction. Compared with conventional microscopy, which uses wavelength specific lenses, computational methods can (i) remove lens aberrations algorithmically, (ii) increase the space–bandwidth product (SBP) by orders of magnitude, and (iii) provide quantitative maps of strain, electron density, refractive index, or magnetization.

== History ==
Early foundations of computational microscopy trace back to the solution of the phase problem in crystallography and optics, and to the development of Fourier-based iterative algorithms for phase retrieval. In 1972, Gerchberg and Saxton introduced the first practical iterative algorithm to recover phase information from diffraction and image-plane data. Between 1978 and 1982, Fienup refined this approach by developing the error-reduction and hybrid input–output algorithms, which have been widely used in iterative phase retrieval.

In 1998, Miao, Sayre, and Chapman introduced the concept of the oversampling ratio for phase retrieval, which was later generalized to the overdetermination ratio (α_{o} = M/N), where M and N denote the number of independently measured data points and unknown object variables, respectively. When α_{o} is substantially greater than one, the phase information is, in principle, uniquely encoded within the measured diffraction intensities and can be deterministically recovered through iterative reconstruction algorithms.

In 1999, Miao and colleagues experimentally extended crystallographic methodology to non-crystalline specimens, inaugurating CDI as a lensless imaging technique.

In 2007, Rodenburg and co-workers demonstrated modern ptychography with hard X-rays by scanning a coherent probe across an extended specimen and iteratively reconstructing the object transmission function while assuming a known probe. In 2008, Thibault et al. demonstrated simultaneous reconstruction of both the probe and object transmission functions from overlapping diffraction patterns, establishing ptychography as a quantitative and general high-resolution imaging method.

In 2013, Zheng, Horstmeyer, and Yang extended these principles to optical microscopy with Fourier ptychography, enabling gigapixel-scale quantitative phase imaging on table-top microscopes.

Subsequent advances in coherent sources, detectors, and algorithms have established computational microscopy as a unified framework spanning optical, X-ray, and electron modalities.

== Principles ==
When a coherent beam of photons or electrons interacts with a specimen, detectors record only the diffraction intensities, while the corresponding phase information is lost—a challenge known as the phase problem. Computational microscopy reconstructs the complex transmission function of the specimen by enforcing consistency between measured data and physical constraints through iterative optimization. These algorithms typically alternate between real and reciprocal space, employing schemes such as alternating projections, the extended ptychographic iterative engine (ePIE), difference maps, and maximum likelihood, and others. Recently, deep-learning–based approaches have been developed to infer the missing phase directly from measured diffraction patterns, enabling faster and more robust reconstructions.

Compared to lens-based methods, computational microscopy (i) can surpass objective-limited resolution through synthetic numerical aperture in Fourier ptychography or by capturing high-angle scattering in ptychography; (ii) provides quantitative maps of phase, strain, and electron density without contrast transfer function correction; and (iii) enables non-destructive three-dimensional imaging of thick, heterogeneous samples such as integrated circuits and biological tissues. Limitations include radiation damage in X-ray and electron modalities, depth-of-field constraints, the "missing cone" problem in 3D optical reconstructions, long acquisition times for dynamic samples, and high computational demands.

== Methods ==
=== Coherent diffractive imaging (CDI) ===
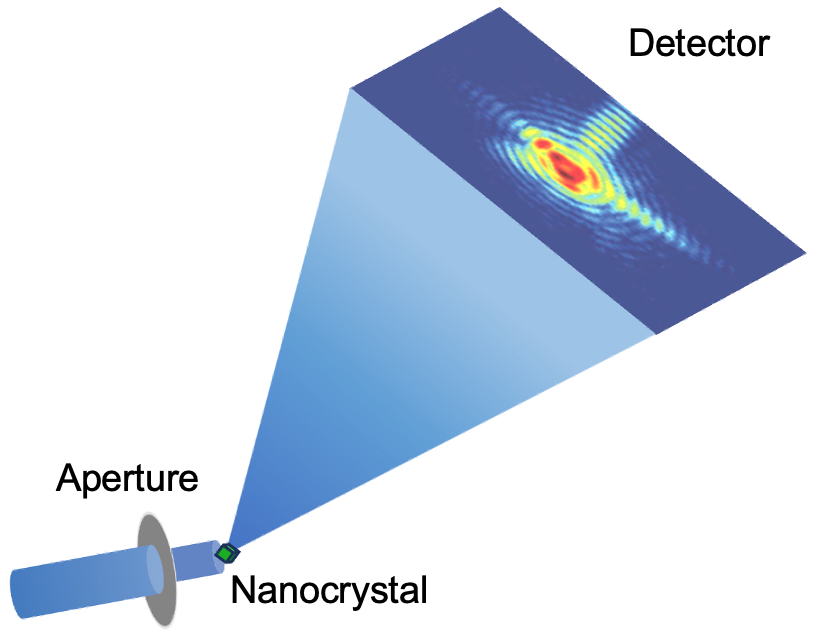
Bragg CDI. Diffraction patterns around one or multiple Bragg peaks are collected from a nanocrystal.

CDI records oversampled far-field diffraction patterns and reconstructs the object's complex transmission function through iterative phase retrieval. CDI can be implemented in several configurations, including conventional CDI (forward scattering from isolated objects), Bragg CDI (mapping lattice strain in nanocrystals), reflection or grazing-incidence CDI (surface and interface sensitivity), Fresnel CDI (using curved illumination), coherent modulation imaging (enhancing phase retrieval with a known modulator), and holographic CDI (combining holography with iterative reconstruction).

CDI has been realized using a wide range of coherent probes, including synchrotron radiation, X-ray free-electron lasers (XFELs), high-harmonic generation (XUV/EUV), and electrons. Single-pulse CDI experiments with XFELs enable "diffraction before destruction", capturing structural information before radiation damage occurs.

=== Modern ptychography (X-ray and electron) ===
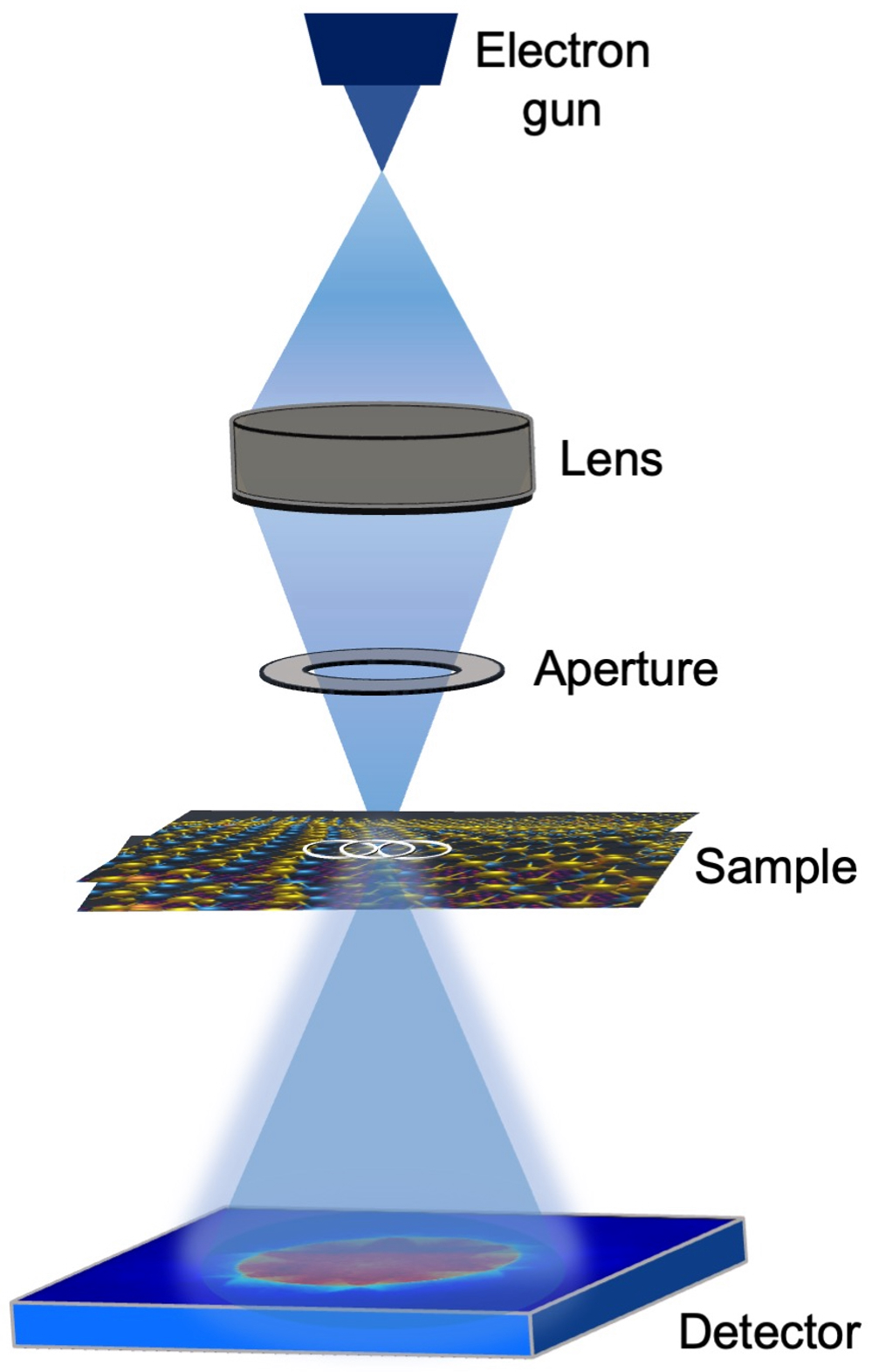
Electron ptychography. A focused electron beam scans the sample, collecting a series of diffraction patterns from partly overlapping regions.

Modern ptychography raster-scans a confined coherent probe across an overlapping grid of positions and iteratively reconstructs the object transmission function from the resulting diffraction patterns. The redundancy created by spatial overlap, combined with oversampling in reciprocal space, leads to rapid convergence, high stability, and quantitative phase recovery.

In the X-ray regime, ptychography enables quantitative imaging of extended samples with nanometre-scale resolution and has become a cornerstone technique at synchrotron and free-electron-laser facilities. In electron microscopy (4D-STEM), ptychography has surpassed the resolution of aberration-corrected transmission electron microscopy, achieving sub-ångström information limits—down to about 0.23 Å using multislice reconstruction—and offers high dose efficiency for radiation-sensitive and light-element materials.

=== Fourier ptychography (optical) ===
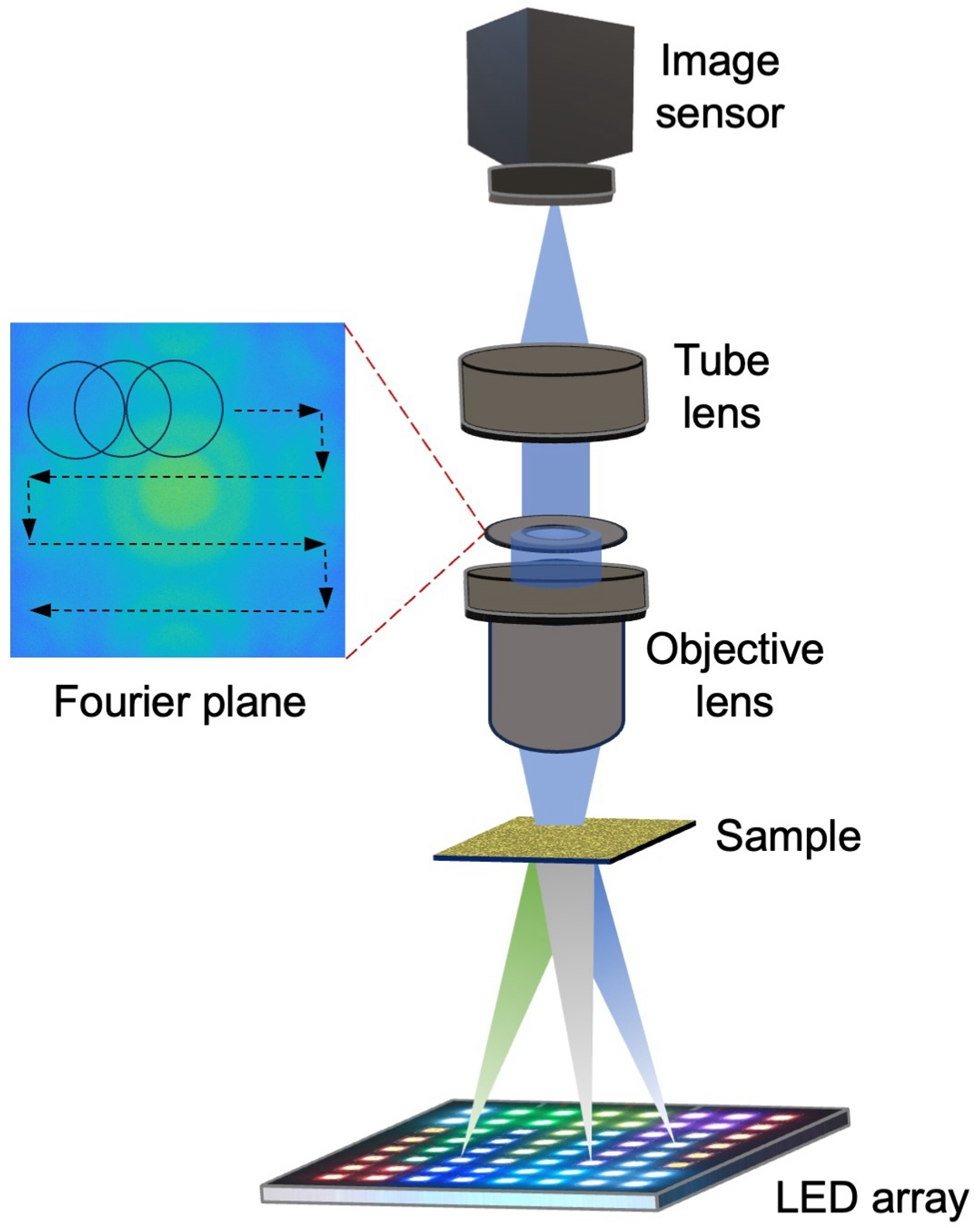
Fourier ptychography. An LED array illuminates the sample from multiple angles, capturing a series of low-NA images that sample different regions of the Fourier spectrum. Computational phase retrieval combines them into a high-NA image with quantitative phase contrast.

Fourier ptychography (FP) synthesizes a high–numerical-aperture (NA) pupil by varying the illumination angle—typically using programmable LED arrays—and computationally stitching the corresponding Fourier spectra. This process greatly expands the space–bandwidth product (SBP), achieving gigapixel-scale imaging with quantitative phase contrast.

FP enables label-free quantitative phase imaging with digital refocusing and can be extended to three dimensions through diffraction tomography and multislice reconstruction models. These developments established Fourier ptychography as a computational method for quantitative phase imaging for wide-field, high-resolution optical microscopy across biological, biomedical, and materials applications.

=== Tomography and 3D imaging ===
Iterative, constraint-based reconstruction algorithms adapted from phase retrieval have enabled Atomic Electron Tomography (AET) to achieve 3D atomic resolution without assuming crystallinity. The first demonstration reached 2.4 Å resolution, resolving individual atoms directly from experimental tilt series. Subsequent developments localized atomic coordinates with picometre precision and determined the 3D atomic structures of amorphous solids, revealing short- and medium-range order and providing a foundation for quantitative studies of local chemistry, strain, and defects in complex materials.

Integrating ptychography with AET, known as ptychographic atomic electron tomography (pAET), offers a dose-efficient pathway to determine the 3D positions of light atoms and radiation-sensitive materials at atomic precision. Beyond electrons, CDI and ptychography have been extended to X-ray tomography and laminography, enabling non-destructive 3D imaging of nanomaterials, magnetic textures, integrated circuits, and biological specimens with quantitative phase contrast and nanometre-scale resolution.

== Applications ==
=== Quantum and magnetic materials ===
Vector ptychographic tomography combined with X-ray magnetic dichroism enables three-dimensional mapping of spin textures—such as Bloch points, hedgehogs, and skyrmions—with spatial resolutions of approximately 10–100 nm. These techniques provide quantitative information on the vector components of magnetization and have been used to reveal the topology and interactions of nanoscale magnetic monopoles in ferromagnetic meta-lattices. Time-resolved implementations using pump–probe schemes have further captured ultrafast magnetization dynamics on the picosecond timescale, offering insights into nonequilibrium spin processes in quantum and magnetic materials.

=== Energy materials and operando imaging ===
In situ Bragg coherent diffractive imaging (BCDI) enables three-dimensional mapping of lattice displacement and strain in battery cathodes during electrochemical cycling, revealing nanoscale strain-accumulation pathways that drive structural degradation and voltage fade in Li- and Mn-rich layered oxides. Correlative ptychography–spectroscopy–tomography extends these measurements by quantifying the coupled evolution of structure, chemistry, and oxidation states in three dimensions, providing mechanistic insight into electrochemical degradation processes at the nanoscale.

=== Nanomaterials and ultrafast dynamics ===
CDI and ptychography enable quantitative three-dimensional imaging of defect evolution, grain dynamics, and superlattice order in nanomaterials with spatial resolutions of approximately 7–15 nm. These methods have revealed the internal structure and disorder of nanoparticle assemblies and multimaterial frameworks with quantitative precision. Femtosecond XFEL experiments extend these capabilities to the temporal domain, capturing single-particle shape evolution, lattice motion, and melting on picosecond timescales, thereby providing insight into nonequilibrium structural dynamics at the nanoscale.

=== Integrated circuits and device metrology ===
Ptychographic X-ray tomography and laminography provide non-destructive three-dimensional metrology of advanced integrated circuits, resolving nanoscale structures such as gates, fins, and interconnects within commercial CMOS chips. Recent advances in burst ptychography and digital refocusing have achieved 4.2 nm half-pitch resolution on a 7 nm-node IC while extending the field of view and acquisition throughput, establishing X-ray ptychography as a powerful tool for quantitative device characterization and failure analysis.

=== Biology and biomedicine ===
Optical Fourier ptychography (FP) enables label-free, quantitative phase imaging of tissues and cells with gigapixel-scale space–bandwidth products and three-dimensional reconstructions via diffraction tomography, eliminating the need for mechanical z-scans. X-ray ptychography of frozen-hydrated biological specimens reveals ultrastructural details and, when combined with X-ray fluorescence, enables correlative mapping of elemental distributions in three dimensions.

Cryogenic electron ptychography has recently achieved sub-nanometre resolution in single-particle analysis and is emerging as a complementary technique to cryo-electron tomography for thicker biological specimens, offering improved contrast for weakly scattering materials and quantitative phase information across large fields of view.

== Instrumentation and Detectors ==
Hybrid pixel array detectors in X rays and dedicated EMPAD sensors in electron microscopes provide high dynamic range and fast frame rates suited to CDI/ptychography; next generation charge integrating detectors (e.g., CITIUS) further accelerate data collection and improve SNR.

== Future directions ==
Future developments in computational microscopy are expected to focus on automation, integration, and data-driven reconstruction. Automation pipelines for data acquisition, phase retrieval, and tomographic reconstruction will streamline workflows and make CDI and ptychography more accessible to non-specialists. Advances in deep-learning phase retrieval promise to accelerate image reconstruction by learning direct mappings between diffraction patterns and object structures, reducing reliance on iterative algorithms and enabling real-time, large-scale analysis.

At the methodological level, routine sub-ångström electron ptychography and dose-efficient ptychographic atomic electron tomography (pAET) are anticipated to enable three-dimensional atomic imaging of light elements and radiation-sensitive materials with unprecedented precision. Continued development of low-dose in situ CDI, exploiting coherent interference between static and dynamic components, may reduce radiation damage by orders of magnitude. Meanwhile, atomic-resolution X-ray CDI at fourth-generation synchrotron sources could extend atomic-scale imaging to thicker samples and provide complementary chemical and magnetic contrast. In the optical regime, Fourier ptychography integrated with fluorescence and super-resolution modalities is poised to transform quantitative phase imaging in clinical digital pathology, while specialized software suites and automated analysis frameworks will further broaden adoption across disciplines.
