= Computational photography =

Set of digital image capture and processing techniques

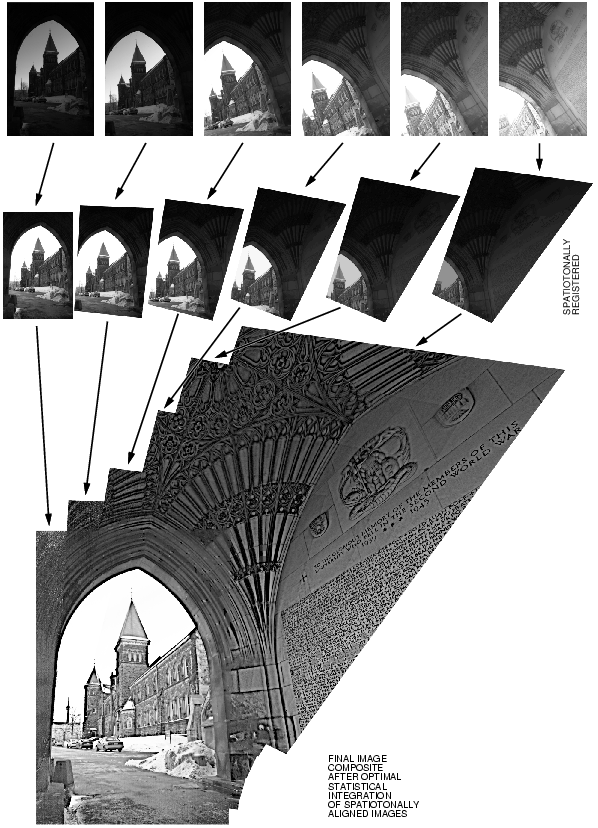
Computational photography provides many new capabilities. This example combines HDR (High Dynamic Range) imaging with panoramics (image-stitching), by optimally combining information from multiple differently exposed pictures of overlapping subject matter.

Computational photography refers to digital image capture and processing techniques that use digital computation instead of optical processes. Computational photography can improve the capabilities of a camera, or introduce features that were not possible at all with film-based photography, or reduce the cost or size of camera elements. Examples of computational photography include in-camera computation of digital panoramas, high-dynamic-range images, and light field cameras. Light field cameras use novel optical elements to capture three-dimensional scene information, which can then be used to produce 3D images, enhanced depth-of-field, and selective de-focusing (or "post focus"). Enhanced depth-of-field reduces the need for mechanical focusing systems. All of these features use computational imaging techniques.

The definition of computational photography has evolved to cover a number of subject areas in computer graphics, computer vision, and applied optics. These areas are given below, organized according to a taxonomy proposed by Shree K. Nayar. Within each area is a list of techniques, and for each technique, one or two representative papers or books are cited. Deliberately omitted from the taxonomy are image processing (see also digital image processing) techniques applied to traditionally captured images to produce better images. Examples of such techniques are image scaling, dynamic range compression (i.e. tone mapping), color management, image completion (a.k.a. inpainting or hole filling), image compression, digital watermarking, and artistic image effects. Also omitted are techniques that produce range data, volume data, 3D models, 4D light fields, 4D, 6D, or 8D BRDFs, or other high-dimensional image-based representations. Epsilon photography is a sub-field of computational photography.

== Effect on photography ==
Photos taken using computational photography can allow amateurs to produce photographs rivalling the quality of professional photographers, but as of 2019 do not outperform the use of professional-level equipment.

== Computational illumination ==
This is controlling photographic illumination in a structured fashion, then processing the captured images, to create new images. The applications include image-based relighting, image enhancement, image deblurring, geometry/material recovery and so forth.

High-dynamic-range imaging uses differently exposed pictures of the same scene to extend dynamic range. Other examples include processing and merging differently illuminated images of the same subject matter ("lightspace").

== Computational optics ==
This is a capture of optically coded images, followed by computational decoding to produce new images. Coded aperture imaging was mainly applied in astronomy and X-ray imaging to boost the image quality. Instead of a single pin-hole, a pinhole pattern is applied in imaging, and deconvolution is performed to recover the image. In coded exposure imaging, the on/off state of the shutter is coded to modify the kernel of motion blur. In this way, motion deblurring becomes a well-conditioned problem. Similarly, in a lens based coded aperture, the aperture can be modified by inserting a broadband mask. Thus, out of focus deblurring becomes a well-conditioned problem. The coded aperture can also improve the quality in light field acquisition using Hadamard transform optics.

Coded aperture patterns can also be designed using color filters, in order to apply different codes at different wavelengths. This allows for increase the amount of light that reaches the camera sensor, compared to binary masks.

== Computational imaging ==
Computational imaging is a set of imaging techniques that combine data acquisition and data processing to create the image of an object through indirect means to yield enhanced resolution, additional information such as optical phase or 3D reconstruction. The information is often recorded without using a conventional optical microscope configuration or with limited datasets.

Computational imaging allows going beyond physical limitations of optical systems, such as numerical aperture, or even obliterates the need for optical elements.

For parts of the optical spectrum where imaging elements such as objectives are difficult to manufacture or image sensors cannot be miniaturized, computational imaging provides useful alternatives, in fields such as X-ray and THz radiations.

=== Common techniques ===
Among common computational imaging techniques are lensless imaging, computational speckle imaging, ptychography and Fourier ptychography.

Computational imaging technique often draws on compressive sensing or phase retrieval techniques, where the angular spectrum of the object is reconstructed. Other techniques are related to the field of computational imaging, such as digital holography, computer vision and inverse problems such as tomography.

== Computational processing ==
This is the processing of non-optically-coded images to produce new images.

== Computational sensors ==
These are detectors that combine sensing and processing, typically in hardware, like the oversampled binary image sensor.

== Early work in computer vision ==
Although computational photography is a currently popular buzzword in computer graphics, many of its techniques first appeared in the computer vision literature, either under other names or within papers aimed at 3D shape analysis.

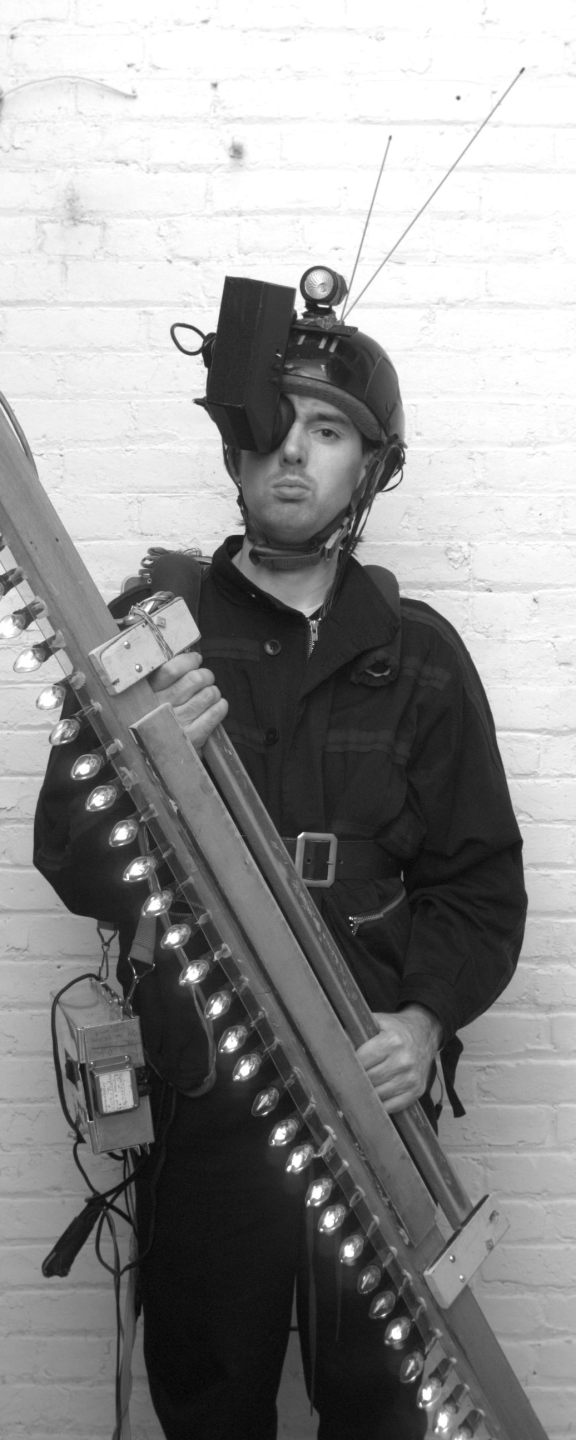
A 1981 wearable computational photography apparatus

== Art history ==
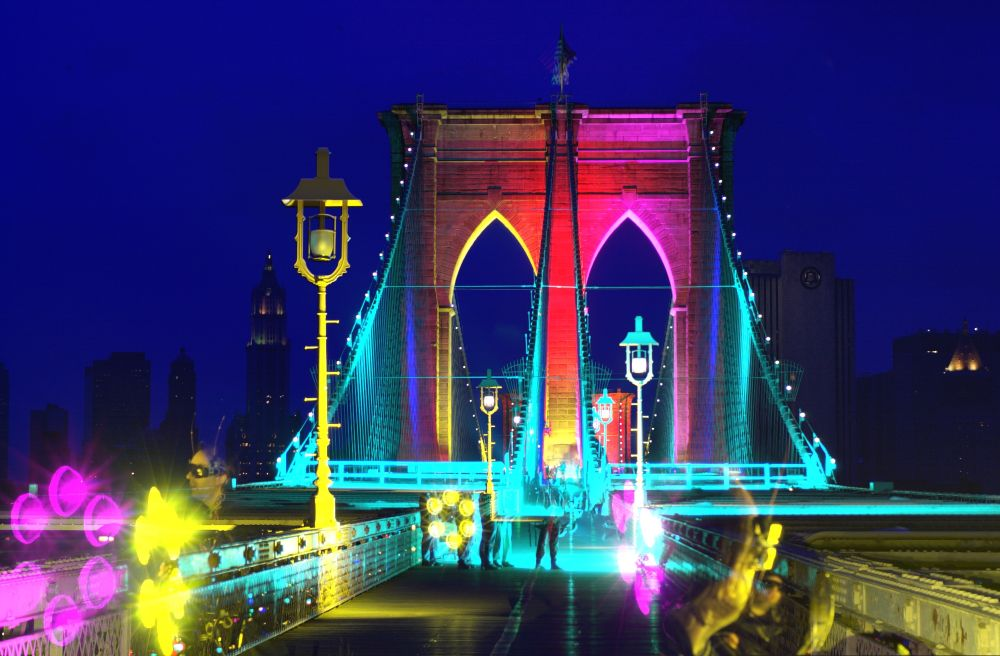
Wearable Computational Photography originated in the 1970s and early 1980s, and has evolved into a more recent art form. This picture was used on the cover of the John Wiley and Sons textbook on the subject.

Computational photography, as an art form, has been practiced by capturing differently exposed pictures of the same subject matter and combining them. This was the inspiration for the development of the wearable computer in the 1970s and early 1980s. Computational photography was inspired by the work of Charles Wyckoff, and thus computational photography datasets (e.g. differently exposed pictures of the same subject matter that are taken in order to make a single composite image) are sometimes referred to as Wyckoff Sets, in his honor.

Early work in this area (joint estimation of image projection and exposure value) was undertaken by Mann and Candoccia.

Charles Wyckoff devoted much of his life to creating special kinds of 3-layer photographic films that captured different exposures of the same subject matter. A picture of a nuclear explosion, taken on Wyckoff's film, appeared on the cover of Life Magazine and showed the dynamic range from the dark outer areas to the inner core.

== See also ==
- Adaptive optics
- Comparison of raster graphics editors
- Multispectral imaging
- List of photo stitching software
- Simultaneous localization and mapping
- Super-resolution microscopy
- Time-of-flight camera
