= Peter Nellist =

British materials scientist

Peter Nellist FRS
- Known for: Electron microscopy

Academic background
- Education: University of Cambridge
- Doctoral advisor: John Rodenburg

Academic work
- Discipline: Materials Science
- Institutions: University of Cambridge; University of Birmingham; Trinity College Dublin; University of Oxford; Oak Ridge National Laboratory
- Website: Official website

Peter David Nellist is a British physicist and materials scientist, currently a professor in the Department of Materials at the University of Oxford. He is noted for pioneering new techniques in high-resolution electron microscopy.

== Early life and career ==
Nellist gained his B.A. (1991), M.A. (1995) and Ph.D (1996) from St John's College, Cambridge, and studied at the Cavendish Laboratory with John Rodenburg, before taking up post-doctoral research at Oak Ridge National Laboratory (ORNL) in Tennessee with ex-Cavendish researcher Stephen Pennycook. Eighteen months later, Nellist returned to Cambridge on a Royal Society University Research Fellowship, which he transferred to the University of Birmingham. He left academia for four years to work for another ex-Cambridge microscopy pioneer, Ondrej Krivanek, at Nion, his newly formed company in Seattle. Nellist then returned to Trinity College Dublin and finally to the University of Oxford, where he became Joint Head of the Department of Materials in 2019.

== Scientific research ==
Nellist's research focuses on scanning transmission electron microscopy and its use in materials science. In particular, he is noted for work on electron ptychography, quantitative image interpretation, and the development of corrective electron microscope lenses, which he describes as "like spectacles for a microscope".

== Achievements and awards ==
In the mid-1990s, working with John Rodenburg at the Cavendish Laboratory in Cambridge, he helped to devise new ways of improving the resolution of both scanning electron microscopes and transmission electron microscopes.

In 1998, working with Stephen Pennycook of ORNL, he recorded "the highest resolution microscope images ever made of crystal structures". Six years later, Nellist, Pennycook, and colleagues at ORNL produced the first images of atoms in a crystal on sub-Angstrom scales by using a new technique to correct the optical aberrations in a scanning transmission electron microscope.

Nellist has won many awards, including the 2007 Burton Medal from the Microscopy Society of America for "an exceptional contribution to microscopy", the 2013 Ernst Ruska Prize from the German Electron Microscopy Society for the development of confocal electron microscopy, the 2013 Birks Award from the Microbeam Analysis Society, and the 2016 and 2020 European Microscopy Society prizes for best published paper in materials science. He was elected a Fellow of the Royal Society in 2020. He is the vice-president of the Royal Microscopical Society (of which he was also made an Honorary Fellow in 2020) and a board member of the European Microscopy Society.

== Selected publications ==
=== Books ===
- Pennycook, Stephen; Nellist, Peter, eds. (2011). Scanning Transmission Electron Microscopy: Imaging and Analysis. New York: Springer. ISBN 978-1-4419-7200-2.

=== Scientific papers ===
- Nellist, P; Chisholm, F; Dellby, N; Krivanek, O; Murfitt, M; et al. (17 September 2004). "Direct sub-angstrom imaging of a crystal lattice". Science. 305 (5691): 1741. doi:10.1126/science.1100965. PMID 15375260. S2CID 8064440.
- Varela, M; Findlay, S; Lupini, A; Christen, H; Borisevich, A; et al. (March 2004). "Spectroscopic Imaging of Single Atoms Within a Bulk Solid". Phys. Rev. Lett. 92 (9) 095502. arXiv:cond-mat/0401156. Bibcode:2004PhRvL..92i5502V. doi:10.1103/PhysRevLett.92.095502. PMID 15089484. S2CID 4792946.
- Dellby, Niklas; Krivanek, Ondrej; Nellist, Peter; Batson, Philip; Lupini, Andrew (2001). "Progress in aberration-corrected scanning transmission electron microscopy". Journal of Electron Microscopy. 50 (3): 177–185. doi:10.1093/jmicro/50.3.177. PMID 11469406.
- Nellist, P; McCallum, B; Rodenburg, J (April 1995). "Resolution beyond the 'information limit' in transmission electron microscopy". Nature. 374 (6523): 630–632. Bibcode:1995Natur.374..630N. doi:10.1038/374630a0. S2CID 4330017.
