= John Rodenburg =

John Rodenburg FRS
- Born: John Marius Rodenburg; 1960 (age 65–66)
- Education: University of Exeter (BSc); University of Cambridge (PhD)
- Awards: Royal Society University Research Fellowship
- Scientific career
- Fields: Microscopy; Materials analysis
- Workplaces: University of Sheffield; Sheffield Hallam University; Phase Focus Limited; Murray Edwards College, Cambridge
- Thesis: Detection and interpretation of electron microdiffraction patterns (1986)
- Doctoral students: Peter Nellist
- Website: www.sheffield.ac.uk/eee/staff/academics/j_rodenburg

John Marius Rodenburg FRS (born 1960) is emeritus professor in the Department of Electronic and Electrical Engineering at the University of Sheffield. He was elected a Fellow of the Royal Society (FRS) in 2019 for "internationally recognised... work on revolutionising the imaging capability of light, X-ray and electron transmission microscopes".

== Education ==
Rodenburg was educated at University of Exeter where he was awarded a Bachelor of Science degree in Physics with Electronics. He moved to the Cavendish Laboratory to complete his PhD on the detection and interpretation of electron diffraction patterns which was awarded by the University of Cambridge in 1986.

== Career and research ==
Rodenburg worked until 1999 in the University of Cambridge as a University Research Fellow of the Royal Society. He is currently emeritus professor in the Department of Electronics and Electrical Engineering at the University of Sheffield.

His research interests have mostly been in improving the resolution and other capabilities of electron, X-ray and optical microscopy by processing diffraction patterns instead of using lenses. He has innovated many key developments in the diffractive imaging method called ptychography.

In 2006, Rodenburg co-founded Phase Focus Limited, which uses ptychography to image live cells to improve cancer drug design. He served as a director and Chief Scientific Officer from 2006 to 2015.

== Awards and honours ==
Rodenburg was elected a Fellow of the Royal Society (FRS) in 2019.

== Personal ==
Rodenburg is married to the material scientist Professor Conny Rodenburg, and is the brother of the voice coach and writer Patsy Rodenburg
