= Fourier ptychography =

Computational imaging technique in microscopy

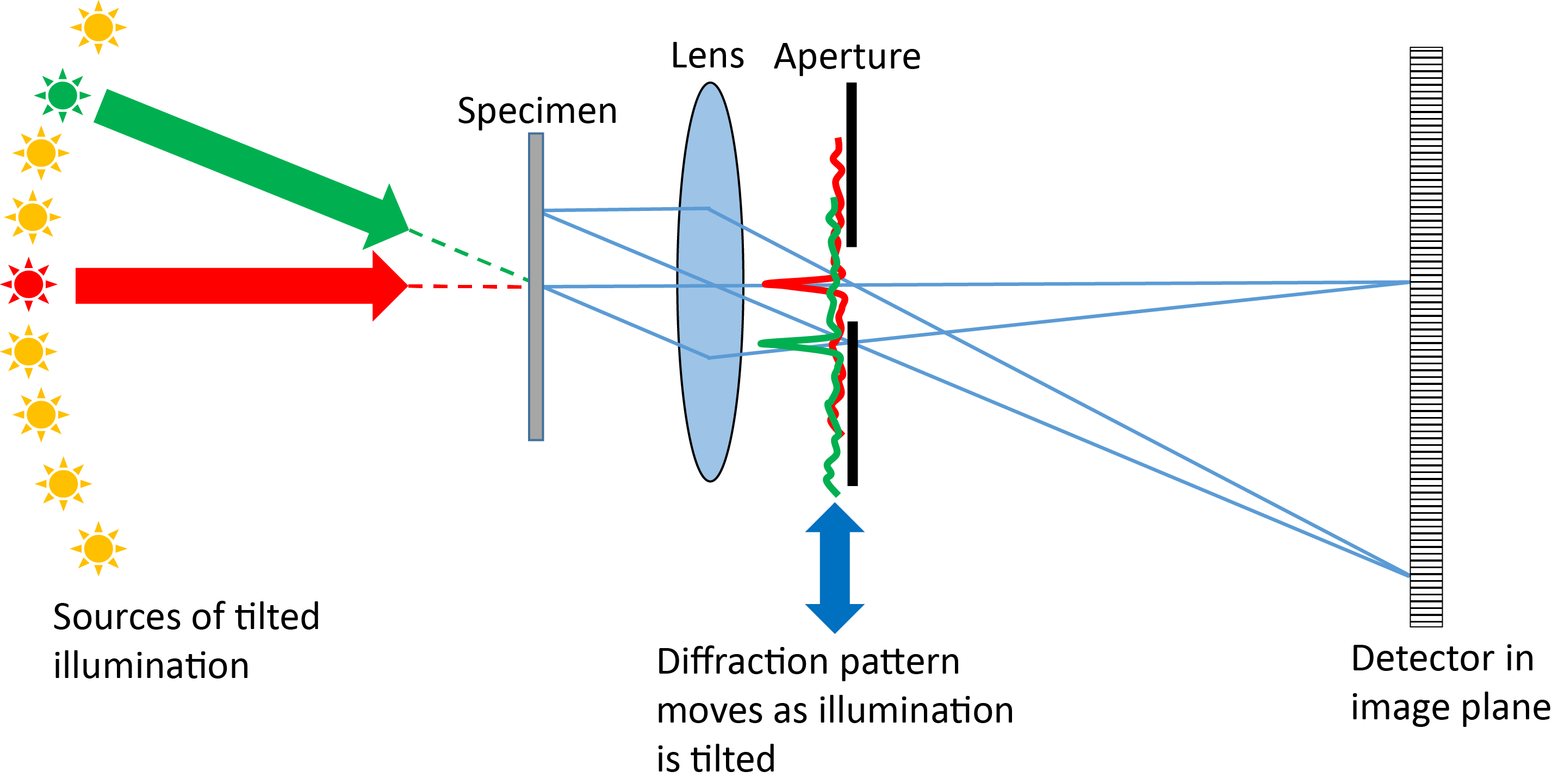
The optical configuration for Fourier ptychography

Fourier ptychography is a computational imaging technique based on optical microscopy that consists in the synthesis of a wider numerical aperture from a set of full-field images acquired at various coherent illumination angles, resulting in increased resolution compared to a conventional microscope.

Each image is acquired under the illumination of a coherent light source at various angles of incidence (typically from an array of LEDs); the acquired image set is then combined using an iterative phase retrieval algorithm into a final high-resolution image that can contain up to a billion pixels (a gigapixel) with diffraction-limited resolution, resulting in a high space-bandwidth product.

Fourier ptychography reconstructs the complex image of the object (with quantitative phase information), but contrary to holography, it is a non-interferometric imaging technique and thus often easier to implement.

The name "ptychography" comes from the ancient Greek word πτυχή ("ptychē", meaning "to fold", also found in the word triptych), because the technique is based on multiple "views" of the object.

== Image reconstruction algorithms ==
The image reconstruction algorithms are based on iterative phase retrieval, either related to the Gerchberg–Saxton algorithm or based on convex relaxation methods. Like real space ptychography, the solution of the phase problem relies on the same mathematical shift invariance constraint, except in Fourier ptychography it is the diffraction pattern in the back focal plane that is moving with respect to the back-focal plane aperture. (In traditional ptychography the illumination moves with respect to the specimen.) Many reconstruction algorithms used in real-space ptychography are therefore used in Fourier ptychography, most commonly PIE and variants such as ePIE and 3PIE. Variants of these algorithms allow for simultaneous reconstruction of the pupil function of an optical system, allowing for the correction of the aberrations of the microscope objective, and diffraction tomography which permits the 3D reconstruction of thin sample objects without requiring the angular sample scanning needed for CT scans.

== Advantages ==
Fourier ptychography can be easily implemented on a conventional optical microscope by replacing the illumination source by an array of LED and improve the optical resolution by a factor 2 (with only bright-field illumination) or more (when including dark-field images to the reconstruction.)

A major advantage of Fourier ptychography is the ability to use a microscope objective with a lower numerical aperture without sacrificing the resolution. The use of a lower numerical aperture allows for larger field of view, larger depth of focus, and larger working distance. Moreover, it enables effective numerical aperture larger than 1 without resorting to oil immersion.

== Relation to ptychography ==
Contrary to Fourier ptychography, (conventional) ptychography swaps the role of the focus element, from an objective to become a condenser, and relies on the acquisition of diffractograms with illumination position diversity. However, the two techniques are both based on the determination of the angular spectrum of the object through a phase retrieval procedure, and inherently reconstruct the same information. Therefore, Fourier ptychography and conventional ptychography provides a bridge between coherent diffraction imaging and full-field microscopy.

== See also ==
- Ptychography
- Computational imaging
- Synthetic-aperture radar
