= Ptychography =

Method of microscopic imaging

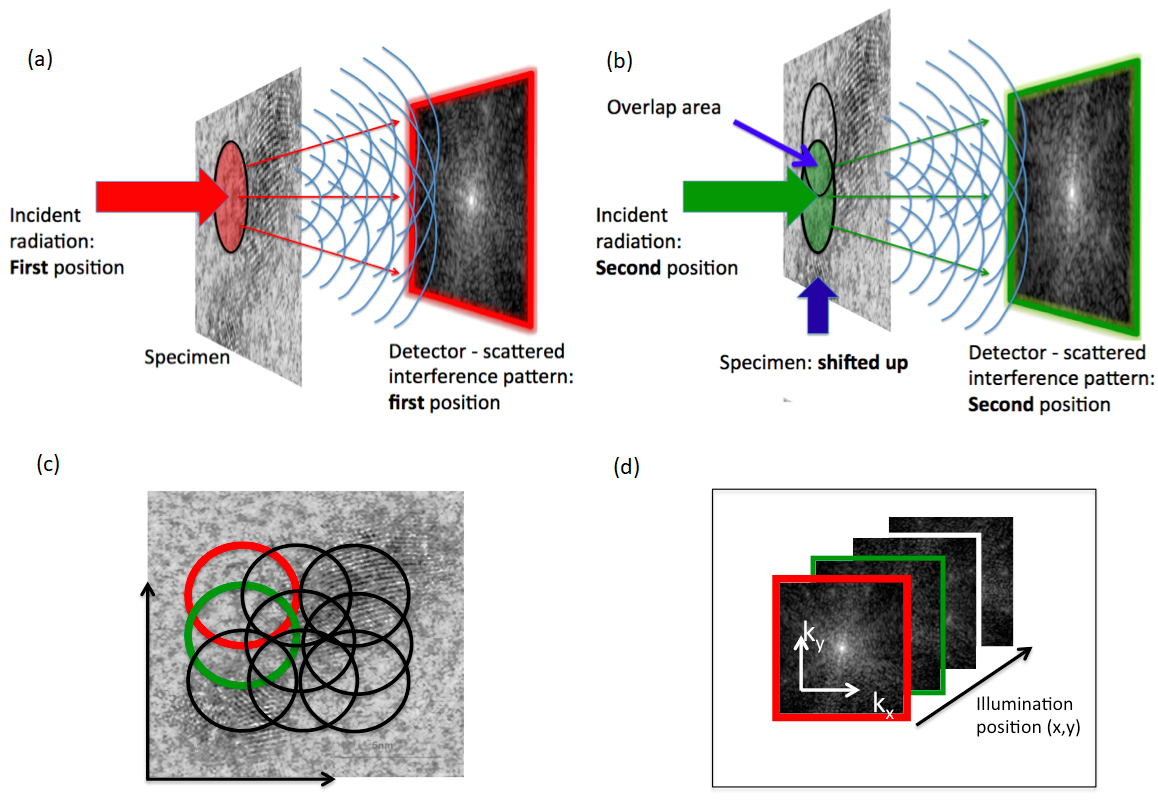
Collection of a ptychographic imaging data set in the simplest single-aperture configuration. (a) Coherent illumination incident from the left is locally confined onto an area of the specimen. A detector downstream of the specimen records an interference pattern. (b) The specimen is shifted (in this case, upwards) and a second pattern is recorded. Note that regions of illumination must overlap with one another to facilitate the ptychographic shift-invariance constraint. (c) A whole ptychographic data set uses many overlapping regions of illumination. (d) The entire data set is four-dimensional: for each 2D illumination position (x, y), there is a 2D diffraction pattern (k_{x}, k_{y}).

Ptychography (/t(a)ɪˈkɒgrəfi/ t(a)i-KO-graf-ee) is a computational microscopy technique that reconstructs the complex-valued image (amplitude and phase) of a specimen from a series of coherent diffraction patterns recorded as a localized probe is scanned with overlap across the sample. It unifies the principles of microscopy and crystallography, combining the real-space imaging of microscopy with the reciprocal-space diffraction analysis of crystallography to produce high-resolution, quantitative images free from lens aberrations. Ptychography has been demonstrated with visible light, X-rays, electrons and extreme-ultraviolet radiation, enabling quantitative phase contrast imaging across nine orders of magnitude in length scales.

Its defining characteristic is translational invariance, which means that the interference patterns are generated by one constant function (e.g. a field of illumination or an aperture stop) moving laterally by a known amount with respect to another constant function (the specimen itself or a wave field). The interference patterns occur some distance away from these two components, so that the scattered waves spread out and "fold" (Ancient Greek: πτυχή, "ptychē" is 'fold') into one another as shown in the figure.

Unlike conventional lens imaging, ptychography is unaffected by lens-induced aberrations or diffraction effects caused by limited numerical aperture. This is particularly important for atomic-scale wavelength imaging, where it is difficult and expensive to make good-quality lenses with high numerical aperture. Another advantage is its high phase sensitivity, enabling clear imaging of transparent or weakly absorbing specimens. This is because it is sensitive to the phase of the radiation that has passed through a specimen, and so it does not rely on the object absorbing radiation. In the case of visible-light biological microscopy, this means that cells do not need to be stained or labelled to create contrast.

Modern ptychography, developed in the 2000s and now the most widely used form of the technique, combines scanning microscopy with coherent diffractive imaging (CDI) through iterative phase-retrieval algorithms. In this approach, a coherent probe—such as an X-ray, electron, or optical beam—is scanned across the specimen with overlapping illumination regions, and a diffraction pattern is recorded at each position. The overlap between adjacent probe positions in real space and diffraction data in reciprocal space provide sufficient redundancy to enable the simultaneous reconstruction of both the probe and the sample transmission functions. This yields quantitative, aberration-free phase images that are robust to partial coherence and experimental imperfections, while providing both high spatial resolution and a large field of view. Modern ptychography has been demonstrated with X-rays, electrons, and visible light, providing sub-ångström resolution in electron microscopy and quantitative three-dimensional imaging through X-ray ptychotomography.

== Phase recovery ==
A detector records the intensity of a diffracted wave, which determines its magnitude, but does not directly measure its phase. Recovering this missing phase information from intensity measurements is known as the phase problem. A phase-retrieval framework was formulated by comparing the number of independently measured equations with the number of unknown variables, showing that phase retrieval can in principle become possible when sufficient additional information is provided through oversampling and other constraints. In modern iterative ptychography, the diffraction patterns are typically sampled sufficiently finely that the corresponding real-space computational window contains the illuminated exit wave; for a localized probe, this gives approximately $\Delta q \lesssim 1/D_p$, where $D_p$ is the effective probe diameter. For an exit-wave support of comparable extent, this requirement is less restrictive than the ideal single-pattern CDI information-counting condition, which corresponds approximately to $\Delta q \lesssim 1/(\sqrt{2}D_p)$ in 2D and $\Delta q \lesssim 1/(2^{1/3}D_p)$ in 3D. The overlap between neighboring probe positions provides additional real-space constraints and redundancy, enabling iterative algorithms to jointly reconstruct the complex-valued object and probe functions. Under suitable experimental conditions, the combination of reciprocal-space sampling and real-space overlap can make the inverse problem highly overdetermined. These concepts have also stimulated substantial research in applied mathematics on the uniqueness, stability and convergence of phase-retrieval problems.

When phase retrieval is successful, ptychography reconstructs the complex-valued specimen transmission function and, in many modern implementations, the probe function, providing quantitative amplitude and phase information. Reconstruction accuracy depends on experimental noise, detector sampling, partial coherence, scan-position errors, the accuracy of the forward model and other experimental imperfections. Phase recovery can be performed using direct methods such as Wigner distribution deconvolution (WDD) or iterative methods. Iterative algorithms repeatedly update estimates of the object and, where applicable, the probe while enforcing consistency with the measured diffraction intensities and constraints from overlapping scan positions. Difference-map methods were applied to ptychographic reconstruction by Thibault and co-workers, and implementations of these and other iterative algorithms are available in open-source software such as PtyPy.

== Optical configurations ==
There are many optical configurations for ptychography: mathematically, it requires two invariant functions that move across one another while an interference pattern generated by the product of the two functions is measured. The interference pattern can be a diffraction pattern, a Fresnel diffraction pattern or, in the case of Fourier ptychography, an image. The "ptycho" convolution in a Fourier ptychographic image derived from the impulse response function of the lens.

=== The single aperture ===
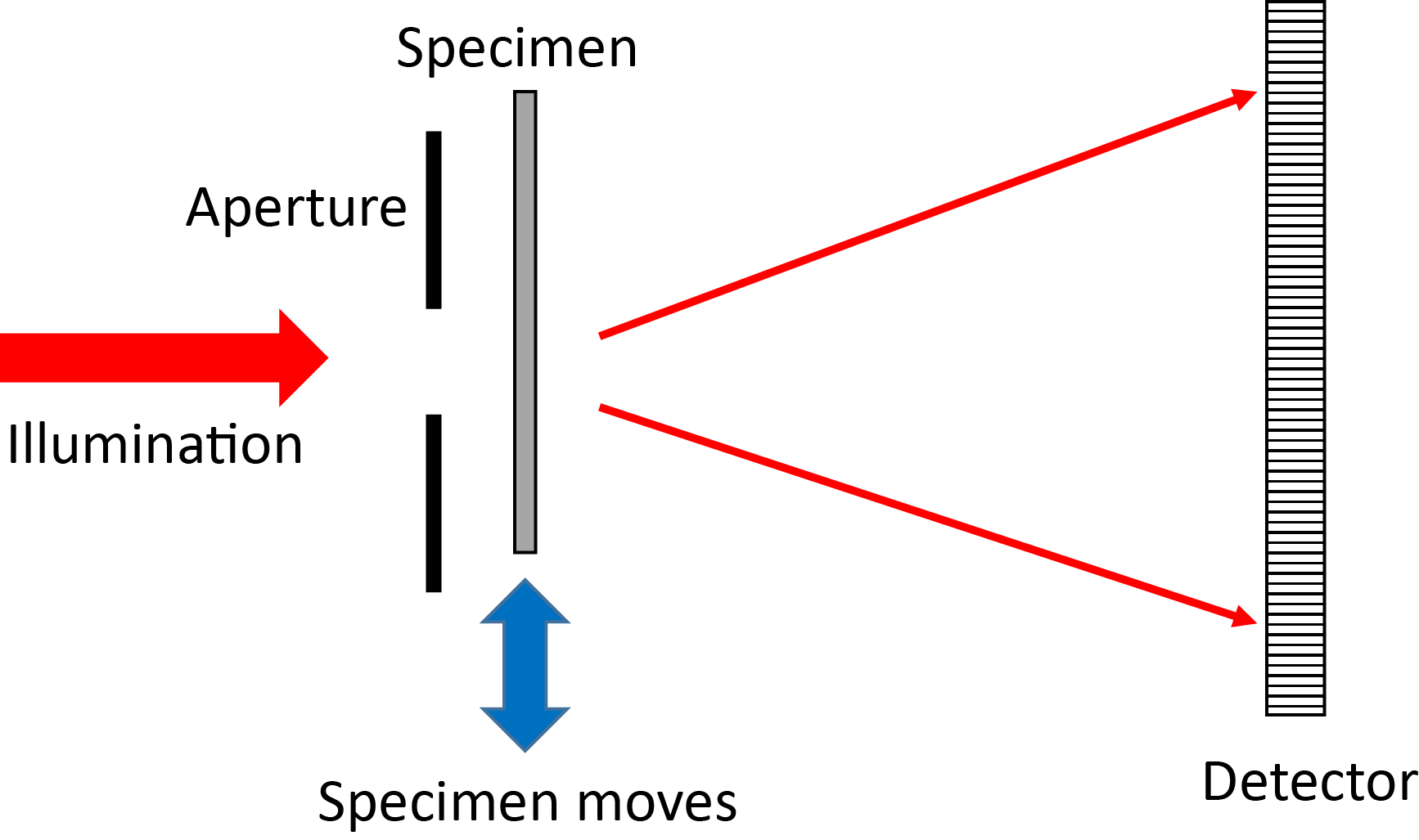
Optical configuration for ptychography using a single aperture

This is conceptually the simplest ptychographical arrangement. The detector can either be a long way from the object (i.e. in the Fraunhofer diffraction plane), or closer by, in the Fresnel regime. An advantage of the Fresnel regime is that there is no longer a very high-intensity beam at the centre of the diffraction pattern, which can otherwise saturate the detector pixels there.

=== Focused-probe ptychography ===
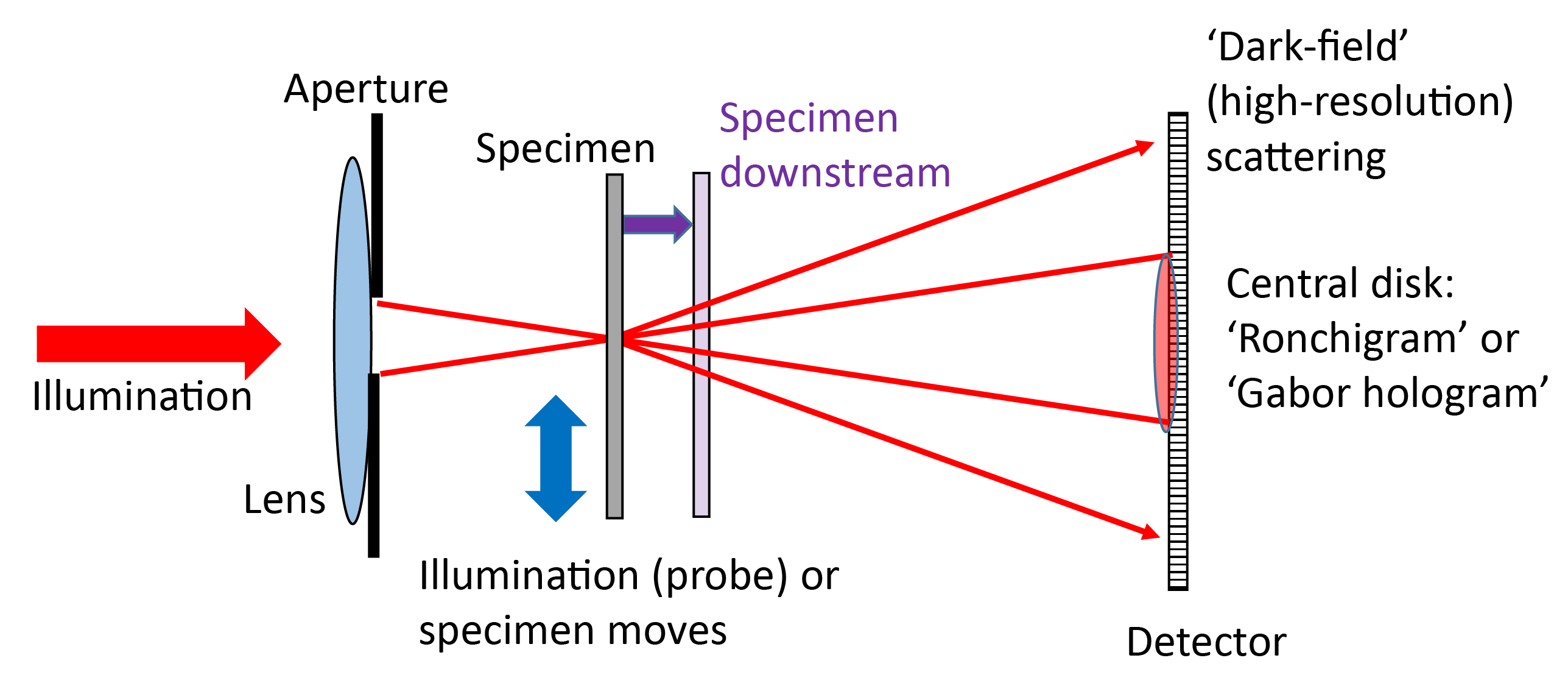
Optical configuration for ptychography using a focused probe

A lens is used to form a tight crossover of the illuminating beam at the plane of the specimen. The configuration is used in the scanning transmission electron microscope (STEM), and often in high-resolution X-ray ptychography. The specimen is sometimes shifted up or downstream of the probe crossover so as to allow the size of the patch of illumination to be increased, thus requiring fewer diffraction patterns to scan a wide field of view.

=== Multislice ptychography ===
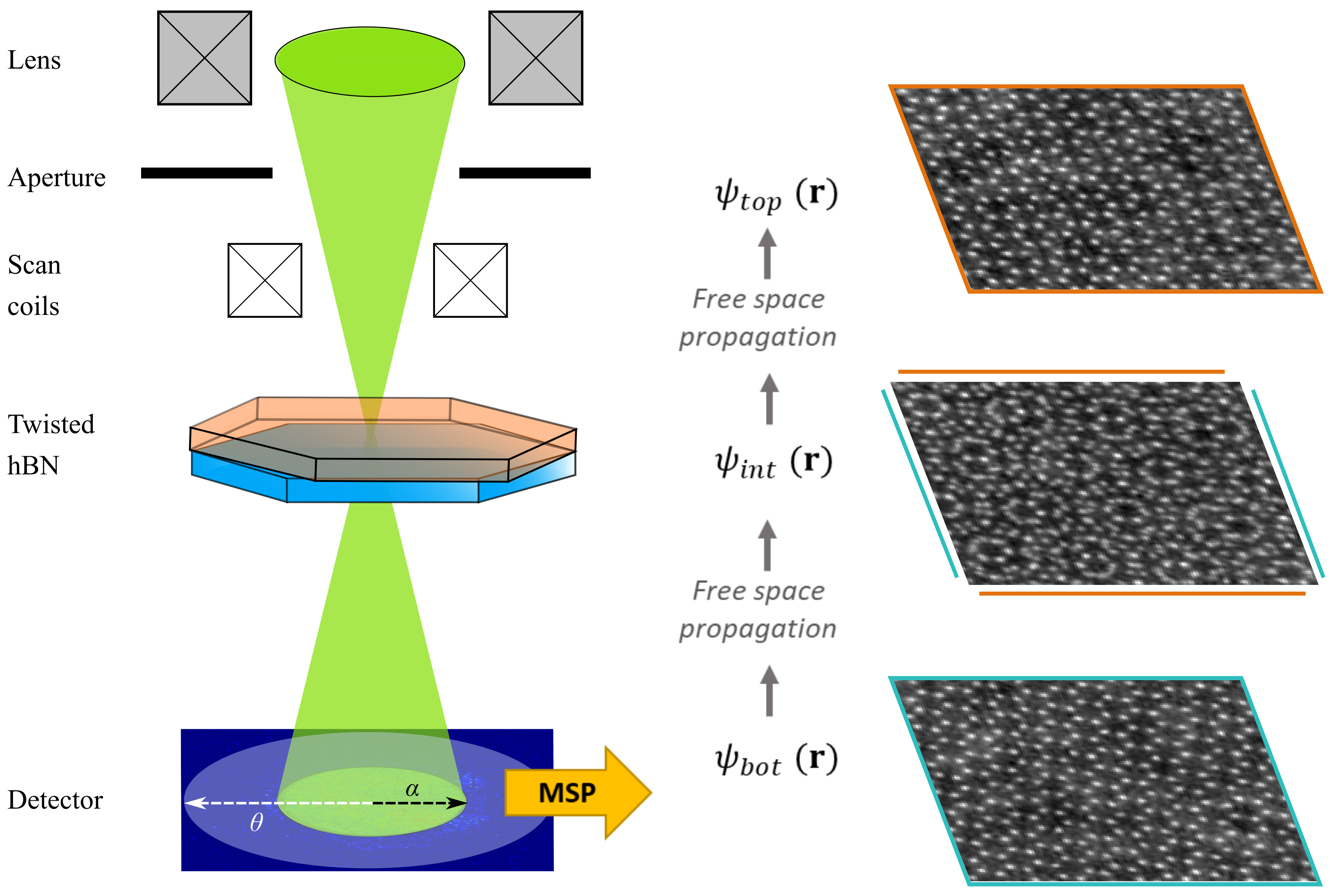
A focused probe scans the sample, collecting diffraction patterns at each position. The algorithm reconstructs multiple phase slices at different depths, decomposing the 3D structure from a single-view scan.

Multislice ptychography extends iterative ptychography to account for multiple scattering and three-dimensional (3D) structure by modeling the specimen as a sequence of transmission slices along the beam propagation direction. This approach addresses the limitations of the single-slice (projection) approximation, which breaks down for thicker samples where electron or X-ray wavefronts undergo significant longitudinal evolution. The conceptual origin for using a single view to recover 3D structural information was demonstrated in ankylography by Miao and collaborator in 2010, which showed that coherent diffraction patterns oversampled on a curved Ewald sphere can encode depth information without the requirement of tilting or depth scanning. The general computational formulation of multislice ptychography was introduced in 2012 by Maiden, Humphry, and Rodenburg, who developed the multislice iterative engine (MIE), incorporating transverse scanning and multislice propagation to reconstruct multiple axial slices from overlapping, oversampled diffraction patterns. Since then, multislice ptychography has been implemented with X-ray, electron, and optical instruments, enabling slice resolved (partial 3D) imaging in thick specimens. An important multislice electron ptychography experiment was reported by Chen, Muller, and collaborators in 2021, producing a phase image of a PrScO_{3} crystal with 0.23 Å resolution.

The achievable depth resolution d_{z} is bounded by
$$d_z = \frac{\lambda}{2\sin^2(\theta / 2)},$$
where λ is the wavelength of the illumination, and θ is the maximum scattering angle captured by the detector. The depth resolution is typically much poorer than the lateral resolution, which is the primary current limitation.

Recent applications of multislice ptychography include atomic-scale imaging of oxygen vacancies in zeolites and high temperature superconductors, oxygen anion displacements in 3D in ferroelectrics, interface mapping in van der Waals heterostructures and moiré phasons in 2D materials. Multislice ptychography continues to evolve rapidly.

=== Near-field ptychography ===
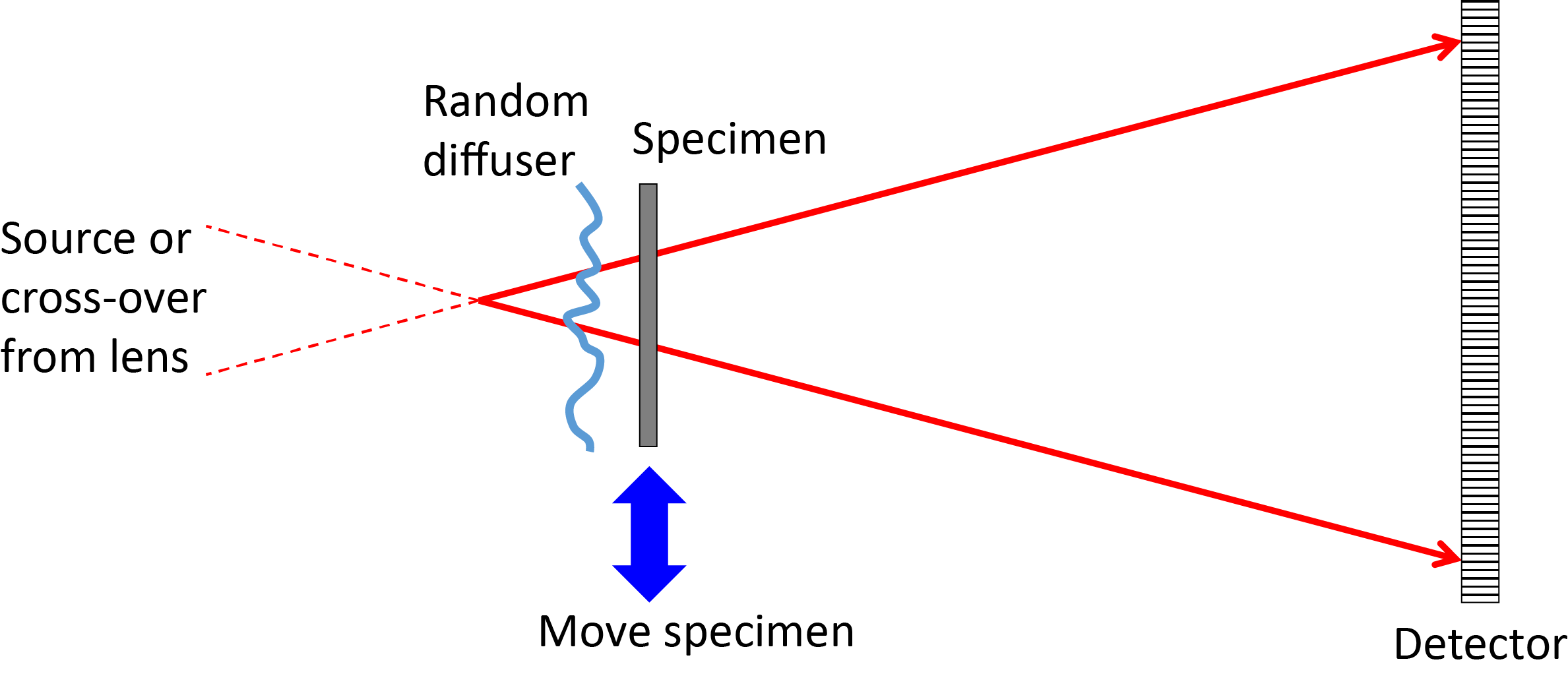
Optical configuration for near-field ptychograhy

This uses a wide field of illumination. To provide magnification, a diverging beam is incident on the specimen. An out-of-focus image, which appears as a Fresnel interference pattern, is projected onto the detector. The illumination must have phase distortions in it, often provided by a diffuser that scrambles the phase of the incident wave before it reaches the specimen, otherwise the image remains constant as the specimen is moved, so there is no new ptychographical information from one position to the next. In the electron microscope, a lens can be used to map the magnified Fresnel image onto the detector.

=== Fourier ptychography ===
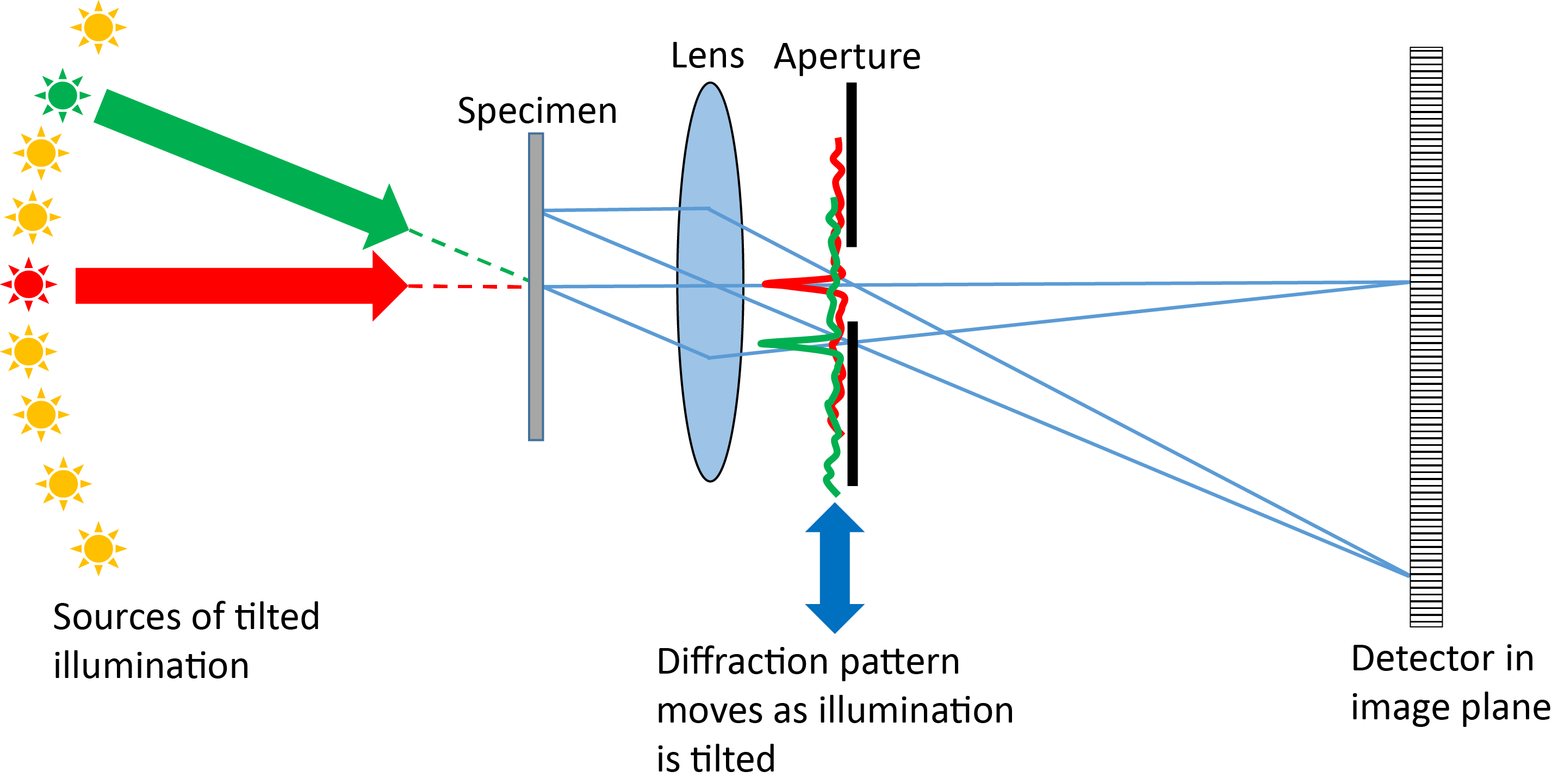
Optical configuration for Fourier ptychography

A conventional microscope is used with a relatively small numerical aperture objective lens. The specimen is illuminated from a series of different angles. Parallel beams coming out of the specimen are brought to a focus in the back focal plane of the objective lens, which is therefore a Fraunhofer diffraction pattern of the specimen exit wave (Abbe's theorem). Tilting the illumination has the effect of shifting the diffraction pattern across the objective aperture (which also lies in the back focal plane). Now the standard ptychographical shift invariance principle applies, except that the diffraction pattern is acting as the object and the back focal plane stop is acting like the illumination function in conventional ptychography. The image is in the Fraunhofer diffraction plane of these two functions (another consequence of Abbe's theorem), just like in conventional ptychography. The only difference is that the method reconstructs the diffraction pattern, which is much wider than the aperture stop limitation. A final Fourier transform must be undertaken to produce the high-resolution image. All the reconstruction algorithms used in conventional ptychography apply to Fourier ptychography, and indeed nearly all the diverse extensions of conventional ptychography have been used in Fourier ptychography.

=== Imaging ptychography ===
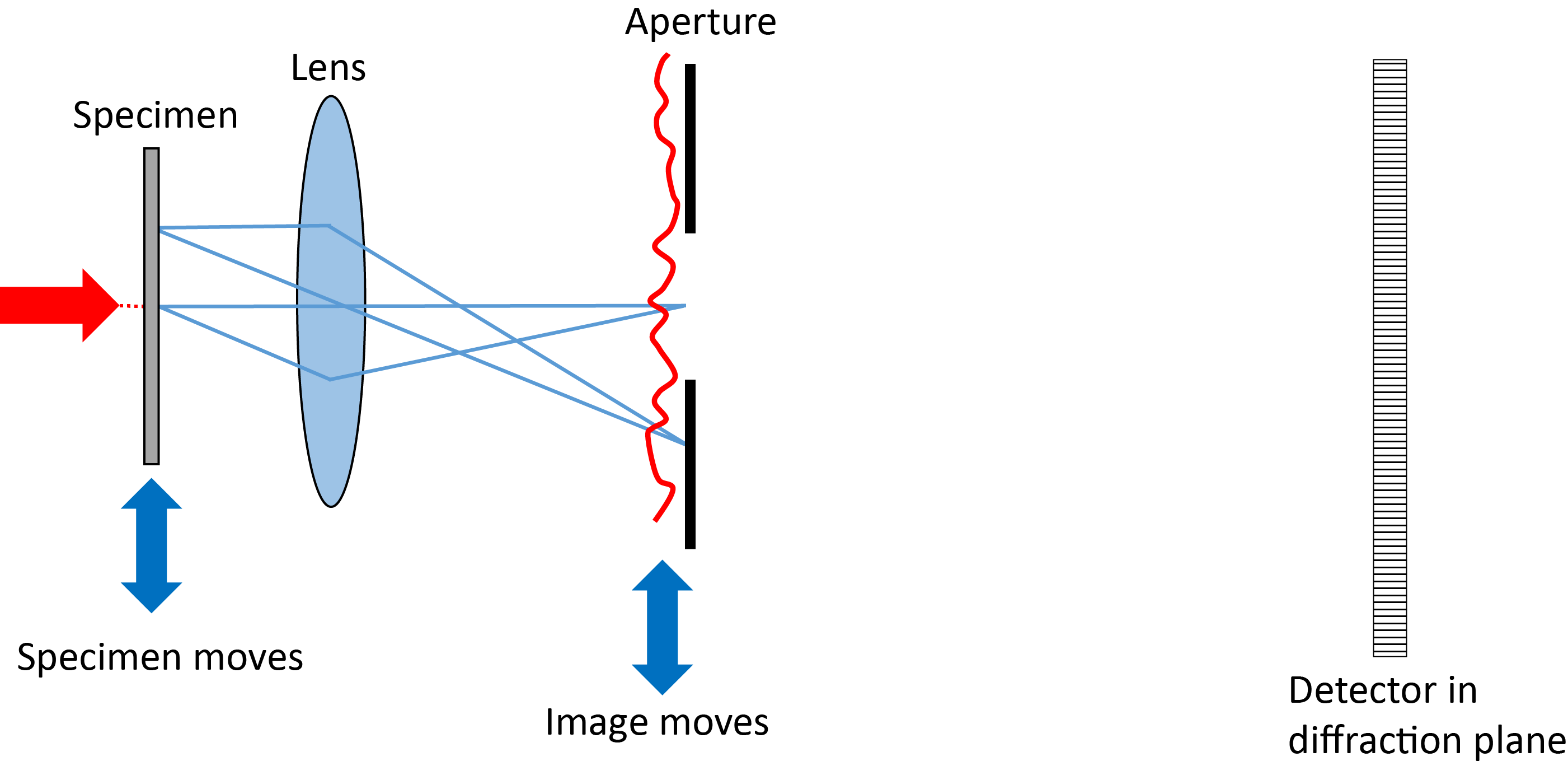
Optical configuration for imaging ptychography

A lens is used to make a conventional image. An aperture in the image plane acts equivalently to the illumination in conventional ptychography, while the image corresponds to the specimen. The detector lies in the Fraunhofer or Fresnel diffraction plane downstream of the image and aperture.

=== Bragg ptychography or reflection ptychography ===
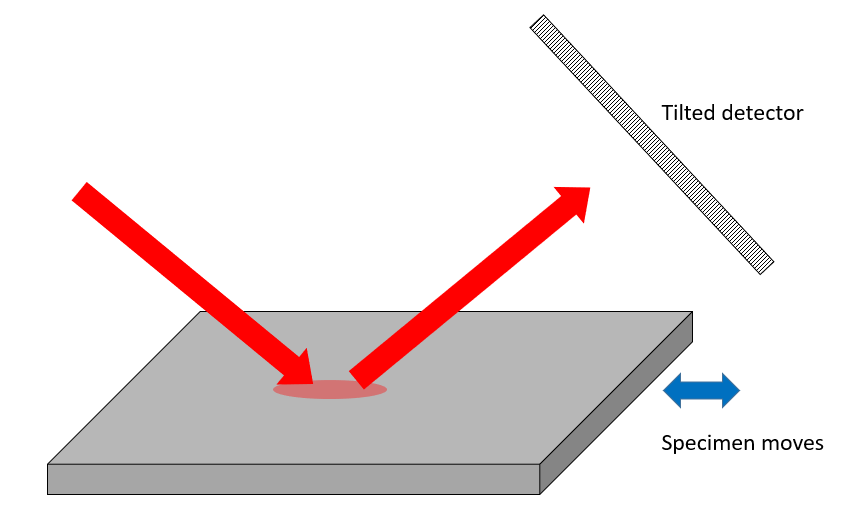
Optical configuration for reflection or Bragg ptychography

This geometry can be used either to map surface features or to measure strain in crystalline specimens. Shifts in the specimen surface, or the atomic Bragg planes perpendicular to the surface, appear in the phase of the ptychographic image.

=== Vectorial ptychography ===
Vectorial ptychography needs to be invoked when the multiplicative model of the interaction between the probe and the specimen cannot be described by scalar quantities. This happens typically when polarized light probes an anisotropic specimen, and when this interaction modifies the state of polarization of light. In that case, the interaction needs to be described by the Jones formalism, where field and object are described by a two-component complex vector and a 2×2 complex matrix respectively. The optical configuration for vectorial ptychography is similar to that of classical (scalar) ptychography, although a control of light polarization (before and after the specimen) needs to be implemented in the setup. Jones maps of the specimens can be retrieved, allowing the quantification of a wide range of optical properties (phase, birefringence, orientation of neutral axes, diattenuation, etc.). Similarly to scalar ptychography, the probes used for the measurement can be jointly estimated together with the specimen. As a consequence, vectorial ptychography is also an elegant approach for quantitative imaging of coherent vectorial light beams (mixing wavefront and polarization features).

== Advantages ==
=== Lens insensitive ===
Ptychography can be undertaken without using any lenses at all, although most implementations use a lens of some type, if only to condense radiation onto the specimen. The detector can measure high angles of scatter, which do not need to pass through a lens. The resolution is therefore only limited by the maximal angle of scatter that reaches the detector, and so avoids the effects of diffraction broadening due to a lens of small numerical aperture or aberrations within the lens. This is key in X-ray, electron and EUV ptychography, where conventional lenses are difficult and expensive to make.

=== Image phase ===
Ptychography solves for the phase induced by the real part of the refractive index of the specimen, as well as absorption (the imaginary part of the refractive index). This is crucial for seeing transparent specimens that do not have significant natural absorption contrast, for example biological cells (at visible light wavelengths), thin high-resolution electron microscopy specimens, and almost all materials at hard X-ray wavelengths. In the latter case, the (linear) phase signal is also ideal for high-resolution X-ray ptychographic tomography. The strength and contrast of the phase signal also means that far fewer photon or electron counts are needed to make an image: this is very important in electron ptychography, where damage to the specimen is a major issue that must be avoided at all costs.

=== Tolerance to incoherence ===
Unlike holography, ptychography uses the object itself as an interferometer. It does not require a reference beam. Although holography can solve the image phase problem, it is very difficult to implement in the electron microscope, where the reference beam is extremely sensitive to magnetic interference or other sources of instability. This is why ptychography is not limited by the conventional "information limit" in conventional electron imaging. Furthermore, ptychographical data is sufficiently diverse to remove the effects of partial coherence that would otherwise affect the reconstructed image.

=== Self-calibration ===
The ptychographical data set can be posed as a blind deconvolution problem. It has sufficient diversity to solve for both the moving functions (illumination and object), which appear symmetrically in the mathematics of the inversion process. This is now routinely done in any ptychographical experiment, even if the illumination optics have been previously well characterised. Diversity can also be used to solve retrospectively for errors in the offsets of the two functions, blurring in the scan, detector faults, like missing pixels, etc.

=== Inversion of multiple scattering ===
In conventional imaging, multiple scattering in a thick sample can seriously complicate, or even entirely invalidate, simple interpretation of an image. This is especially true in electron imaging (where multiple scattering is called "dynamical scattering"). Conversely, ptychography generates estimates of hundreds or thousands of exit waves, each of which contains different scattering information. This can be used to retrospectively remove multiple scattering effects.

=== Robustness to noise ===
The number counts required for a ptychography experiment is the same as for a conventional image, even though the counts are distributed over very many diffraction patterns. This is because the dose fractionation theorem applies to ptychography. Maximum-likelihood methods can be employed to reduce the effects of Poisson noise.

== Applications ==
Applications of ptychography are diverse because it can be used with any type of radiation that can be prepared as a quasi-monochromatic propagating wave.

Ptychographic imaging, along with advances in detectors and computing, has resulted in the development of X-ray microscopes. Coherent beams are required in order to obtain far-field diffraction patterns with speckle patterns. Coherent X-ray beams can be produced by modern synchrotron radiation sources, free-electron lasers and high-harmonic sources. In terms of routine analysis, X-ray ptychotomography is today the most commonly used technique. It has been applied to many materials problems including, for example, the study of paint, imaging battery chemistry, imaging stacked layers of tandem solar cells, and the dynamics of fracture. In the X-ray regime, ptychography has also been used to obtain a 3D mapping of the disordered structure in the white Cyphochilus beetle, and a 2D imaging of the domain structure in a bulk heterojunction for polymer solar cells.

Visible-light ptychography has been used for imaging live biological cells and studying their growth, reproduction and motility. In its vectorial version, it can also be used for mapping quantitative optical properties of anisotropic materials such as biominerals or metasurfaces

Electron ptychography is (amongst other electron imaging modes) sensitive to both heavy and light atoms simultaneously. It has been used, for example, in the study of nanostructure drug-delivery mechanisms by looking at drug molecules stained by heavy atoms within light carbon nanotubes cages. With electron beams, shorter-wavelength, higher-energy electrons used for higher-resolution imaging can cause damage to the sample by ionising it and breaking bonds, but electron-beam ptychography has now produced record-breaking images of molybdenum disulphide with a resolution of 0.039 nm using a lower-energy electron beam and detectors that are able to detect single electrons, so atoms can be located with more precision.

Ptychography has several applications in the semiconductor industry, including imaging their surfaces using EUV, their 3D bulk structure using X-rays, and mapping strain fields by Bragg ptychography, for example, in nanowires.

Typical ptychographic images
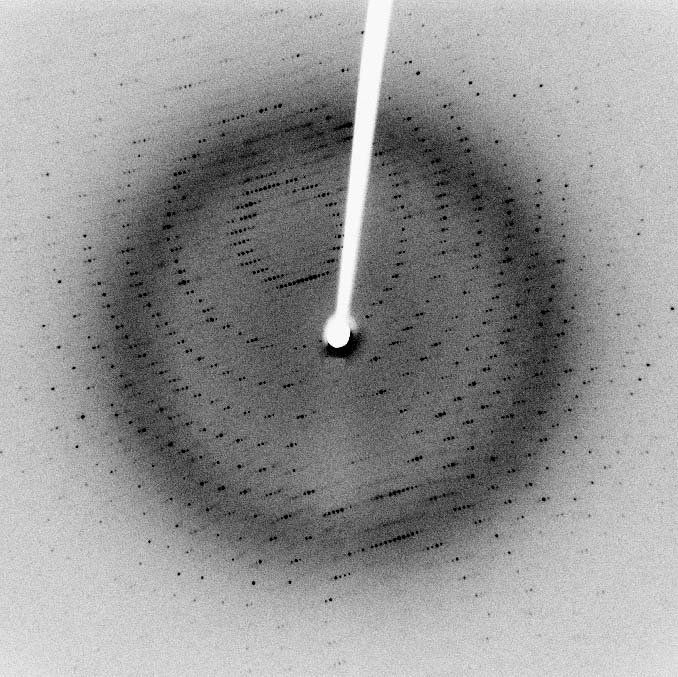
The diffraction pattern of a beam of x-rays passing through a stationary crystal. The dots are areas of constructive interference; the crystal's atomic structure can be worked out from the pattern. In ptychography, a sample (which does not need to be crystalline) is moved sequentially through the beam, creating a range of diffraction patterns.

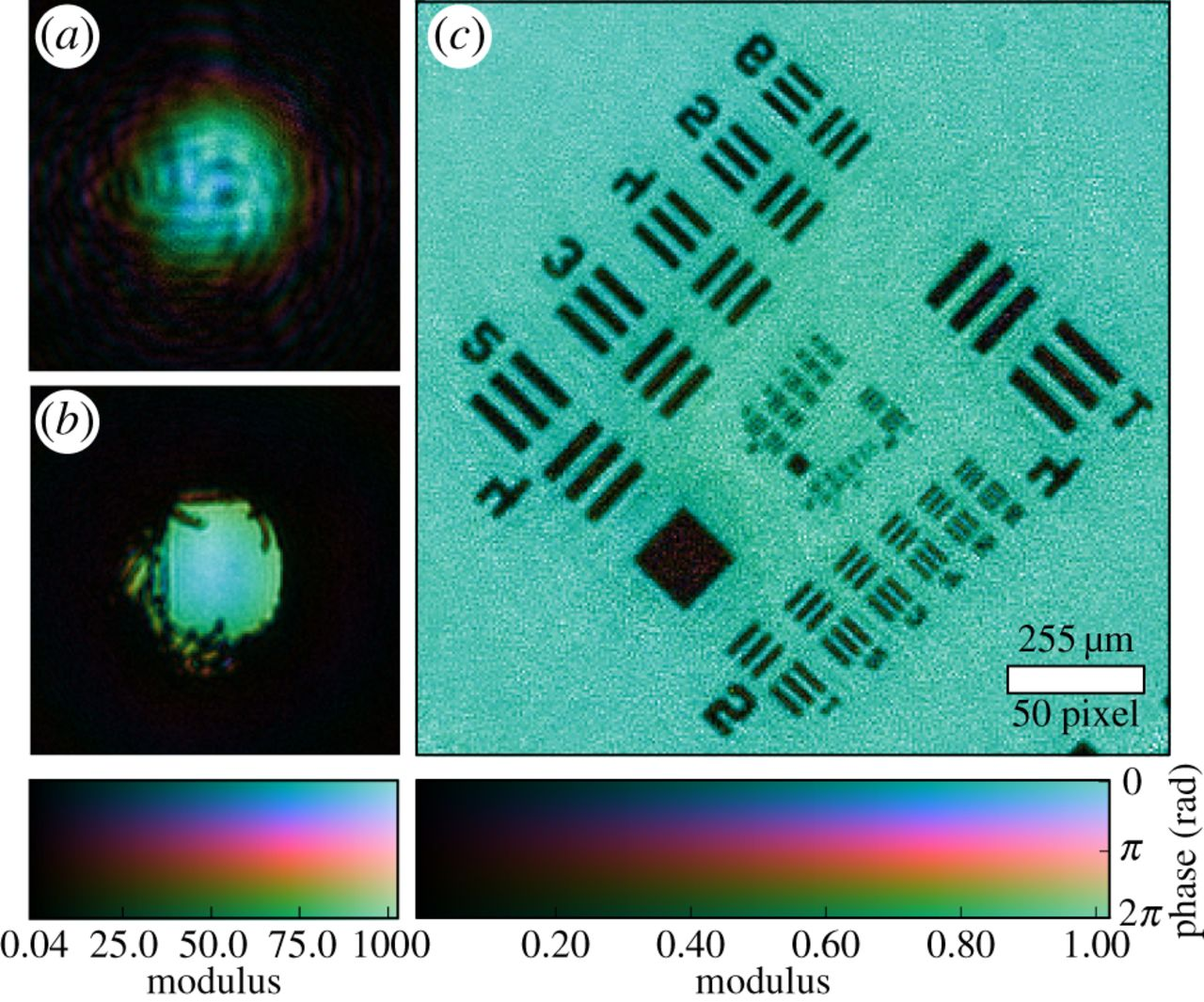
A visible-light ptychograph of a USAF optical resolution target, made using a pinhole aperture in a piece of cardboard. In the graphs, the hue represents the phase, and the modulus represents the luminance. (a) shows a single image with complex diffraction detail. (b) shows the computer-processed version of (a). (c) shows the result from combined computer-processed diffraction data after the whole sample was scanned.

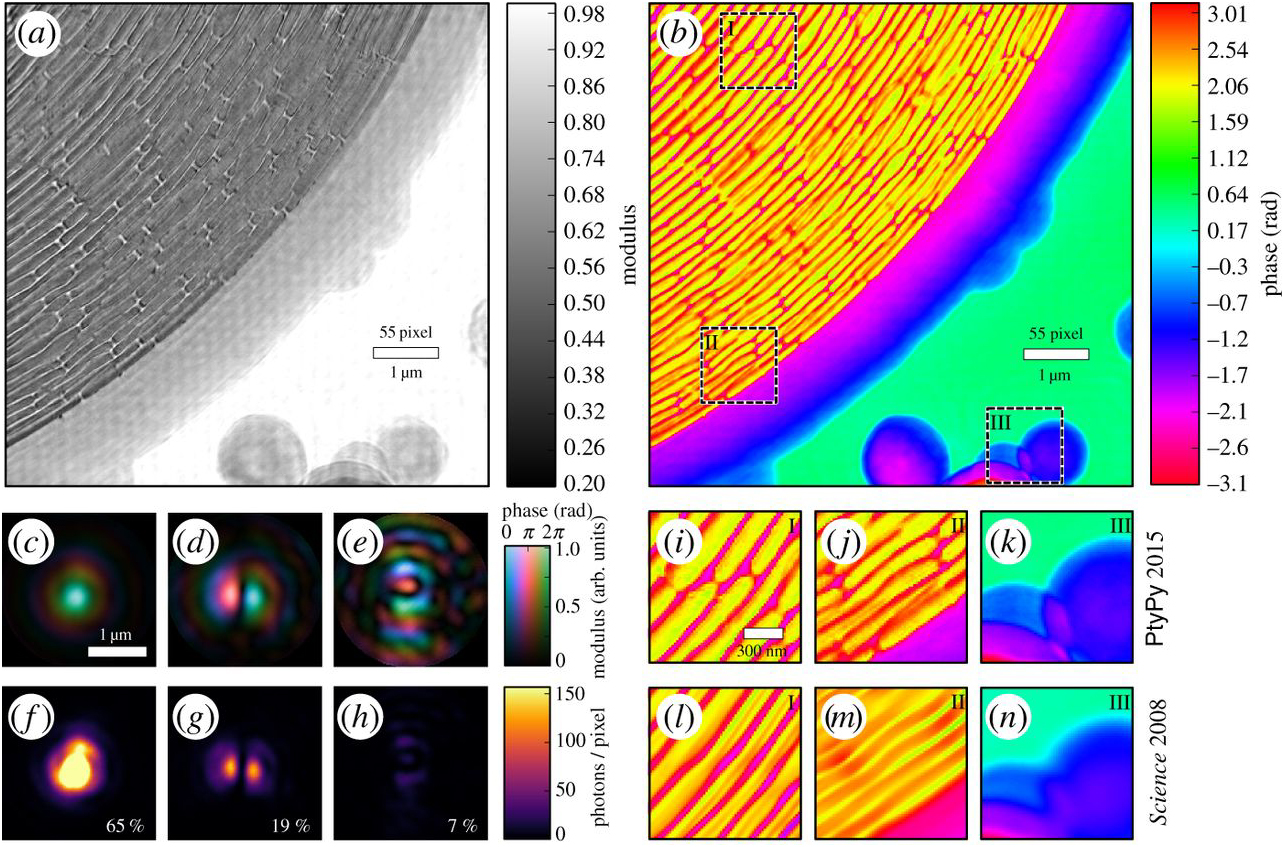
X-ray ptychography at a small-angle scattering beamline of a synchrotron. This x-ray ptychograph of a zone plate shows the luminosity data in image (a) and the phase data in image (b). Insets I, II and III from (b) are shown in (i), (j) and (k) respectively as processed in 2015; they show a clear improvement in resolution over the algorithms used in 2008 shown in (l), (m) and (n).

Ptychography has also been applied to ultrashort pulse reconstruction, applied to different temporal characterization techniques, such as FROG or amplitude swing.

== History ==
=== Origins in crystallography ===
The name "ptychography" was coined by Hegerl and Hoppe in 1970 to describe a solution to the crystallographic phase problem first suggested by Hoppe in 1969. The idea required the specimen to be highly ordered (a crystal) and to be illuminated by a precisely engineered wave so that only two pairs of diffraction peaks interfere with one another at a time. A shift in the illumination changes the interference condition (by the Fourier shift theorem). The two measurements can be used to solve for the relative phase between the two diffraction peaks by breaking a complex-conjugate ambiguity that would otherwise exist. Although the idea encapsulates the underlying concept of interference by convolution (ptycho) and translational invariance, crystalline ptychography cannot be used for imaging of continuous objects, because very many (up to millions) of beams interfere at the same time, and so the phase differences are inseparable. Hoppe abandoned his concept of ptychography in 1973.

=== Closed form solutions and early experimental work (1989–1998) ===
Decades later, Rodenburg and collaborators extended Hoppe's concept by developing non-iterative algorithms such as Wigner Distribution Deconvolution (WDD) and the Single-Side-Band SSB, method (which is an approximation of WWD when the specimen is weakly scattering). These methods were first demonstrated experimentally in one dimension and 2 dimensions using light, and electrons. In the early to mid-1990s, Nellist, McCallum, and Rodenburg demonstrated the first experimental proof of crystalline electron ptychography in the exact scattering geometry first proposed by Hoppe, achieving resolution beyond the 'information limit', which until that time was regarded as the insuperable limit of resolution in the transmission electron microscope Around the same time, Chapman implemented the first X-ray ptychography using the WDD formalism. However, progress was limited at the time because ptychographic reconstruction generally required prior knowledge of the probe, although it had been shown that in principle both functions could be separated using the WWD formulation. Furthermore, the scanning step size had to be approximately half the target resolution., leading to massive 4D STEM data sets that could not be easily accommodated by even the largest computers available at that time. Nowadays, 4D STEM data can be recorded trivially: it is a major area of research.

=== Extending crystallography to non-crystalline samples (1999) ===
In 1999, Miao and collaborators experimentally extended X-ray crystallographic methodology to non-crystalline specimens using coherent diffraction and iterative phase retrieval. The experiment replaced high-resolution imaging lenses with coherent diffraction measurements and computational reconstruction, enabling direct structure determination from coherent diffraction patterns of isolated non-crystalline samples. The work unified principles of microscopy and crystallography and helped establish the framework now described as computational microscopy. It also contributed to the establishment of an international conference series on coherent scattering and phase retrieval, beginning with a workshop held at Lawrence Berkeley National Laboratory in 2001. Building on this computational foundation, research in the 2000s extended iterative phase retrieval to scanning diffraction measurements, leading to the development of modern iterative ptychography.

=== Modern ptychography and general uptake (2004–present) ===
Widespread interest in ptychography followed the first experimental demonstration of iterative X-ray ptychography in 2007 by Rodenburg et al. at the Swiss Light Source (SLS) In 2008, Thibault and collaborators further advanced the field by applying the difference-map (DM) iterative inversion algorithm to ptychographic data, allowing the simultaneous reconstruction of both the probe and the object functions. Later, the PIE was extended to achieve the same thing. Mixed-state ptychography was introduced to account for partial coherence and experimental instabilities, thereby enhancing the accuracy and robustness of reconstructions.

These developments triggered rapid progress at X-ray wavelengths and established modern iterative ptychography as a robust and quantitative imaging technique. By 2010, the SLS had developed X-ray ptychotomography, now a major application of the technique. Since 2010, several groups have developed the capabilities of ptychography to characterize and improve reflective and refractive X-ray optics. Bragg ptychography, for measuring strain in crystals, was demonstrated by Hruszkewycz in 2012. In 2012 it was also shown that electron ptychography could improve on the resolution of an electron lens by a factor of five, a method which was used in 2018 to provide the highest-resolution transmission image ever obtained earning a Guinness world record, and once again in 2021 to achieve an even better resolution. Real-space light ptychography became available in a commercial system for live-cell imaging in 2013. Fourier ptychography using iterative methods was also demonstrated by Zheng et al. in 2013, a field which is growing rapidly. The group of Margaret Murnane and Henry Kapteyn at JILA, CU Boulder demonstrated EUV reflection ptychographic imaging in 2014.

=== History of iterative phase-retrieval algorithms ===
The iterative algorithms used in CDI and ptychography developed from methods for recovering a wavefield or object from intensity measurements and additional constraints. In 1972, Gerchberg and Saxton introduced an algorithm that alternates between the image and diffraction planes, imposing the measured amplitude in each plane while retaining the current phase estimate during each amplitude-replacement step.

In 1978, Fienup developed error-reduction and input-output methods for reconstruction from a Fourier modulus, using non-negativity and optional bounds on the object's extent. His 1982 comparison presented the hybrid input-output algorithm, which uses feedback when the reconstructed object violates the object-domain constraints. In 1987, he demonstrated numerical reconstruction of complex-valued objects using sufficiently restrictive support constraints, which specify where the object can be nonzero.

Alongside algorithm development, Miao, Sayre and Chapman introduced the oversampling ratio in 1998 and analysed phase retrieval by comparing the number of independently measured Fourier intensities with the number of unknown object variables. Miao and Sayre later showed that finer-than-Nyquist sampling creates a larger no-density region around a finite object, providing a real-space support constraint whose extent increases with oversampling. Further algorithmic developments included Elser's difference map, published in 2003, which combines constraint projections to address stagnation. That year, Marchesini and colleagues introduced shrinkwrap, a scheme that updates the object support from the evolving reconstruction. Luke's relaxed averaged alternating reflections (RAAR) algorithm, published in 2005, provided a further projection-and-reflection approach to phase retrieval.

In 2004, Faulkner and Rodenburg introduced iterative reconstruction methods for scanning diffraction measurements, including the ptychographic iterative engine (PIE). These methods used a known probe and consistency between overlapping illuminated regions to update a shared object estimate. In 2008, Thibault and colleagues applied difference-map reconstruction to estimate the object and probe jointly, while Guizar-Sicairos and Fienup developed a nonlinear optimization method for jointly refining the object, illumination and scan positions. In 2009, Maiden and Rodenburg introduced the extended ptychographic iterative engine (ePIE), which updates both the object and probe.

Further developments incorporated statistical models of measurement noise. Thibault and Guizar-Sicairos introduced maximum-likelihood refinement for ptychographic CDI in 2012. Odstrčil, Menzel and Guizar-Sicairos developed an iterative least-squares solver for generalized maximum-likelihood ptychography in 2018. These methods refine reconstructions by optimizing a data-fitting objective based on the measurement model, allowing noise to be represented explicitly.

== See also ==
- Coherent diffractive imaging (CDI)
- Phase retrieval
- Computational imaging
- Fourier ptychography
