= Multi-exposure HDR capture =

Technique to capture HDR images and videos

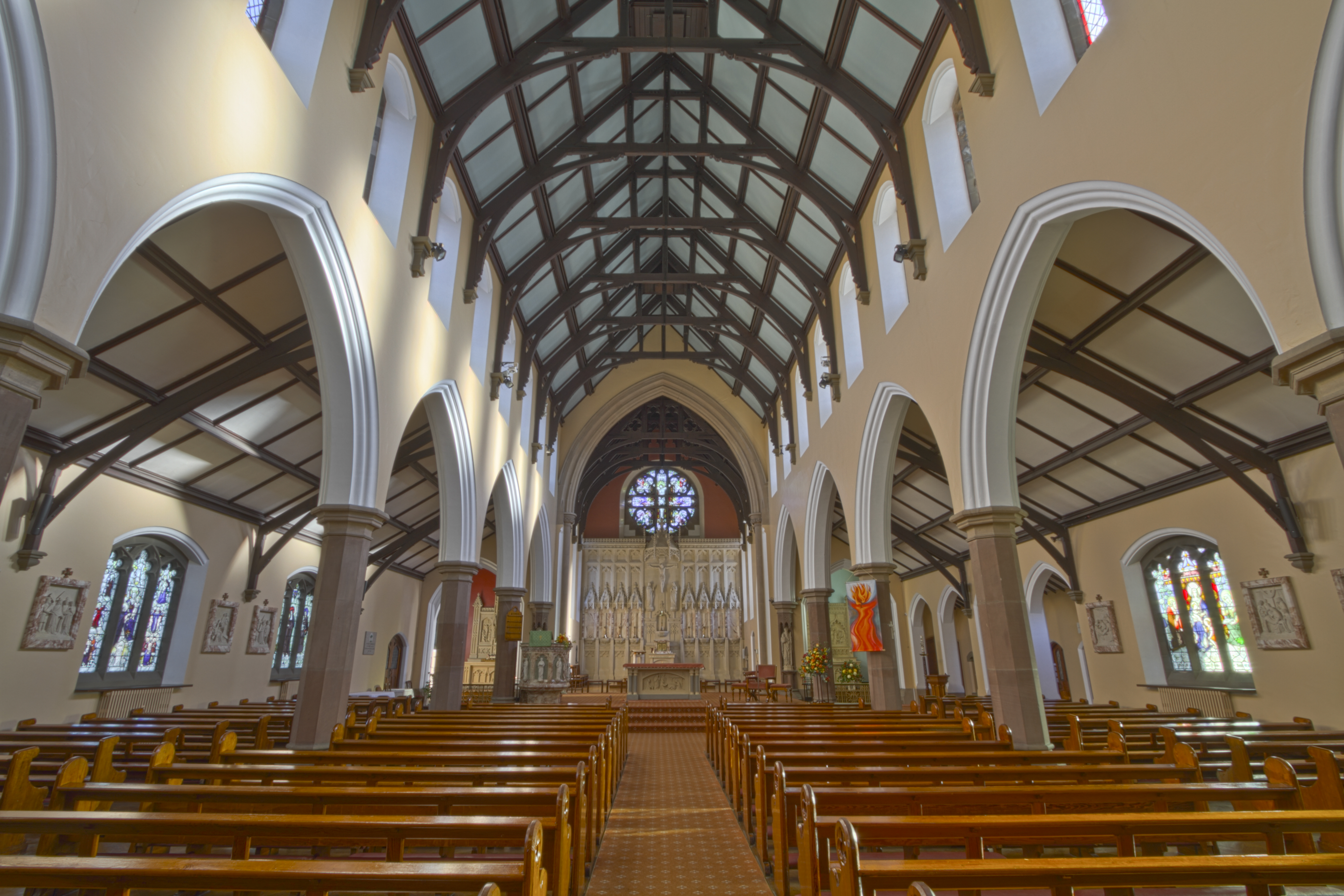
Tone mapped high-dynamic-range (HDR) image of St. Kentigern's Church in Blackpool, Lancashire, England

In photography and videography, multi-exposure HDR capture is a technique that creates high dynamic range (HDR) images (or extended dynamic range images) by taking and combining multiple exposures of the same subject matter at different exposures. Combining multiple images in this way results in an image with a greater dynamic range than what would be possible by taking one single image. The technique can also be used to capture video by taking and combining multiple exposures for each frame of the video. The term "HDR" is used frequently to refer to the process of creating HDR images from multiple exposures. Many smartphones have an automated HDR feature that relies on computational imaging techniques to capture and combine multiple exposures.

A single image captured by a camera provides a finite range of luminosity inherent to the medium, whether it is a digital sensor or film. Outside this range, tonal information is lost and no features are visible; tones that exceed the range are "burned out" and appear pure white in the brighter areas, while tones that fall below the range are "crushed" and appear pure black in the darker areas. The ratio between the maximum and the minimum tonal values that can be captured in a single image is known as the dynamic range. In photography, dynamic range is measured in exposure value (EV) differences, also known as stops.

The human eye's response to light is non-linear: halving the light level does not halve the perceived brightness of a space, it makes it look only slightly dimmer. For most illumination levels, the response is approximately logarithmic. Human eyes adapt fairly rapidly to changes in light levels. HDR can thus produce images that look more like what a human sees when looking at the subject.

This technique can be applied to produce images that preserve local contrast for a natural rendering, or exaggerate local contrast for artistic effect. HDR is useful for recording many real-world scenes containing a wider range of brightness than can be captured directly, typically both bright, direct sunlight and deep shadows. Due to the limitations of printing and display contrast, the extended dynamic range of HDR images must be compressed to the range that can be displayed. The method of rendering a high dynamic range image to a standard monitor or printing device is called tone mapping; it reduces the overall contrast of an HDR image to permit display on devices or prints with lower dynamic range.

== Benefits ==
One aim of HDR is to present a similar range of luminance to that experienced through the human visual system. The human eye, through non-linear response, adaptation of the iris, and other methods, adjusts constantly to a broad range of luminance present in the environment. The brain continuously interprets this information so that a viewer can see in a wide range of light conditions.

Dynamic ranges of common devices
Device	Stops	Contrast ratio
Single exposure
Human eye: close objects	7.5	150...200
Human eye: 4° angular separation	13	8000...10000
Human eye (static)	10...14	1000...15000
Negative film (Kodak VISION3)	13	8000
1/1.7" camera (Nikon Coolpix P340)	11.9	3800
1" camera (Canon PowerShot G7 X)	12.7	6600
Four-thirds DSLR camera (Panasonic Lumix DC-GH5)	13.0	8200
APS DSLR camera (Nikon D7200)	14.6	24800
Full-frame DSLR camera (Nikon D810)	14.8	28500

Most cameras are limited to a much narrower range of exposure values within a single image, due to the dynamic range of the capturing medium. With a limited dynamic range, tonal differences can be captured only within a certain range of brightness. Outside of this range, no details can be distinguished: when the tone being captured exceeds the range in bright areas, these tones appear as pure white, and when the tone being captured does not meet the minimum threshold, these tones appear as pure black. Images captured with non-HDR cameras that have a limited exposure range (low dynamic range, LDR), may lose detail in highlights or shadows.

Modern CMOS image sensors have improved dynamic range and can often capture a wider range of tones in a single exposure reducing the need to perform multi-exposure HDR. Color film negatives and slides consist of multiple film layers that respond to light differently. Original film (especially negatives versus transparencies or slides) feature a very high dynamic range (in the order of 8 for negatives and 4 to 4.5 for positive transparencies).

Multi-exposure HDR is used in photography and also in extreme dynamic range applications such as welding or automotive work. In security cameras the term "wide dynamic range" is used instead of HDR.

=== Limitations ===
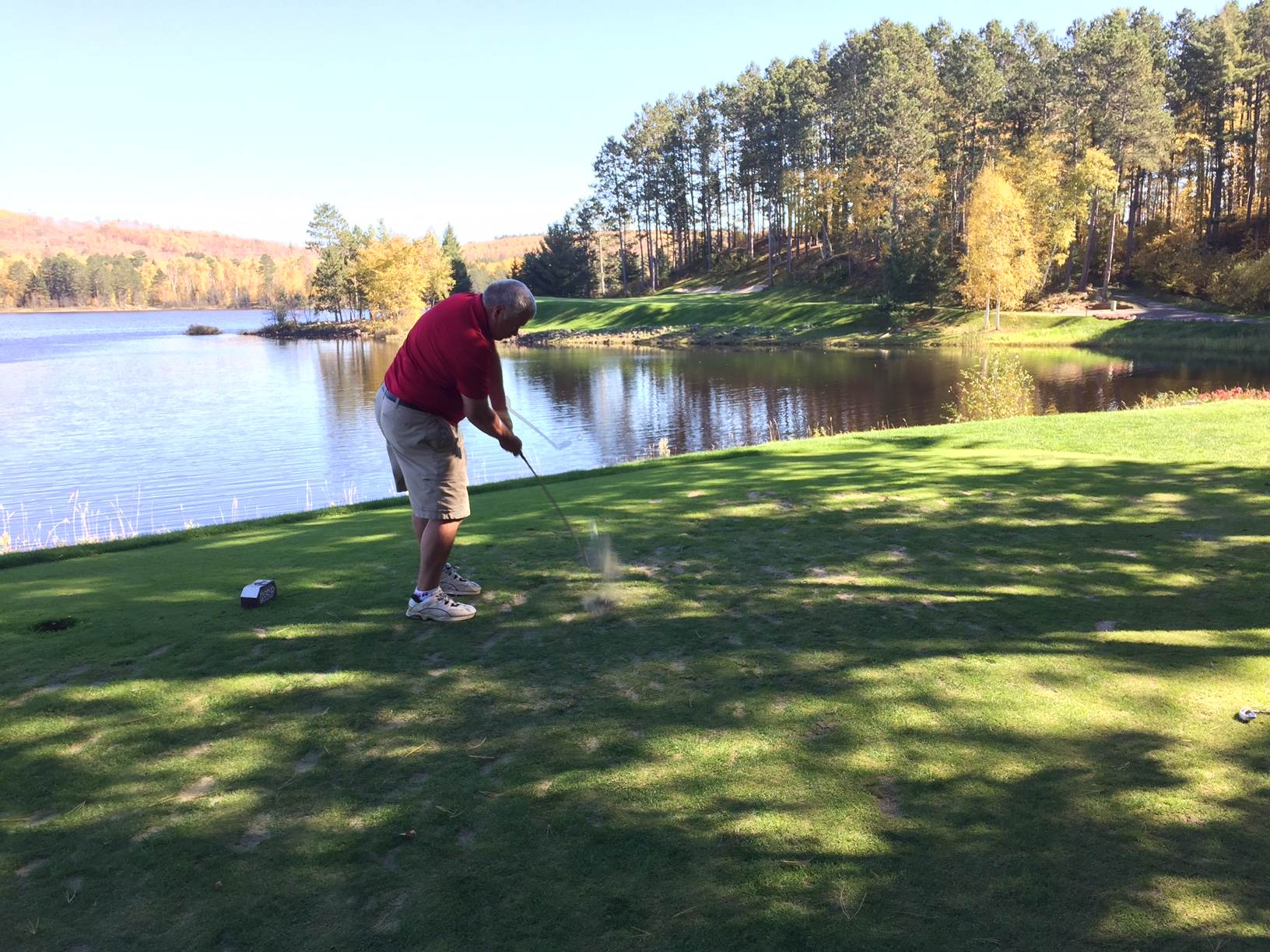
This composited multi-exposure HDR capture shows the correct exposure for both the shaded grass and the bright sky, but the fast-moving golf swing led to a "ghost" club.

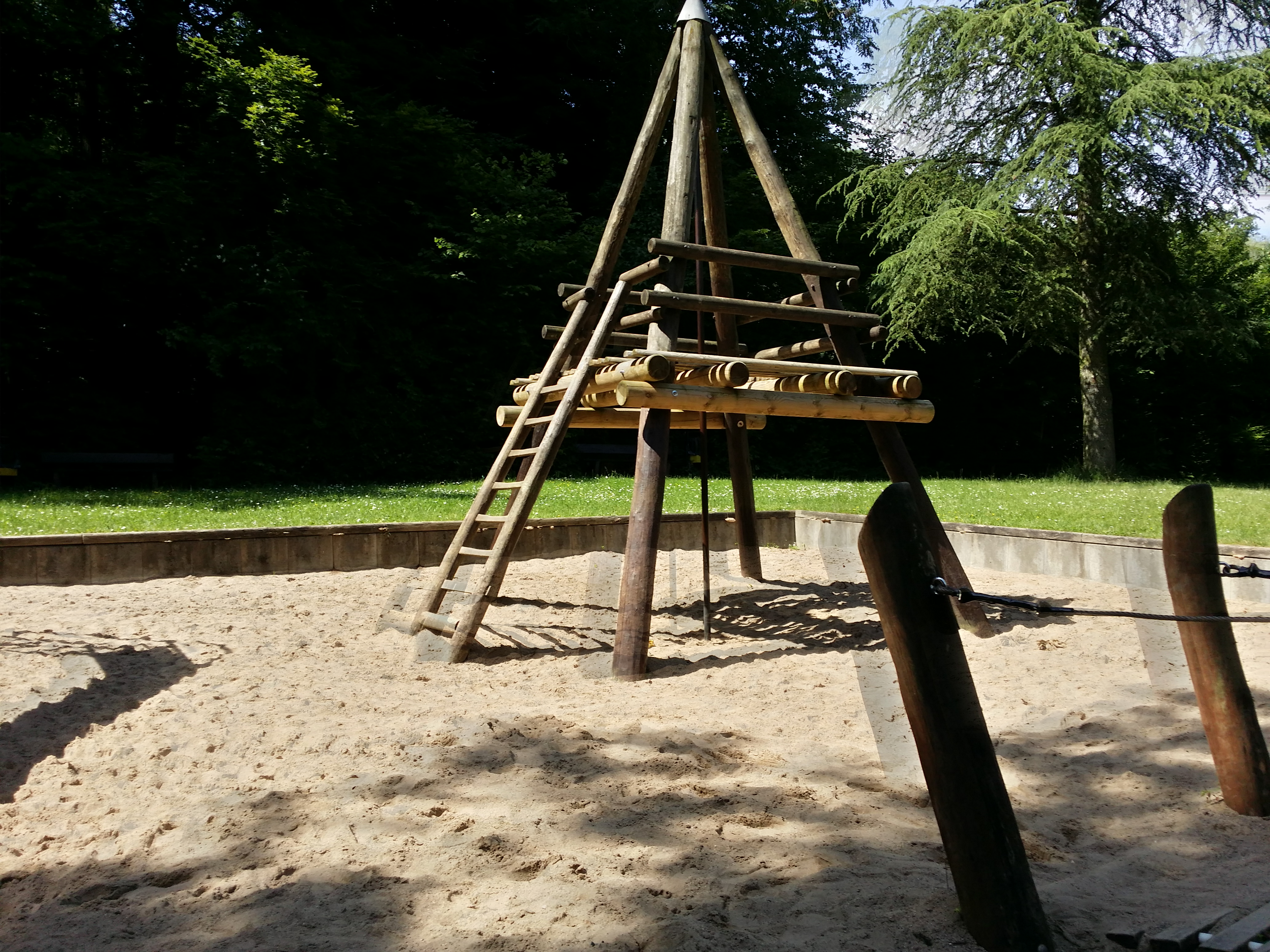
HDR ghosting from spinning carousel

A fast-moving subject, or camera movement between the multiple exposures, will generate a "ghost" effect or a staggered-blur strobe effect due to the merged images not being identical. Unless the subject is static and the camera mounted on a tripod there may be a tradeoff between extended dynamic range and sharpness. Sudden changes in the lighting conditions (strobed LED light) can also interfere with the desired results, by producing one or more HDR layers that do have the luminosity expected by an automated HDR system, though one might still be able to produce a reasonable HDR image manually in software by rearranging the image layers to merge in order of their actual luminosity.

Because of the nonlinearity of some sensors image artifacts can be common. Camera characteristics such as gamma curves, sensor resolution, noise, photometric calibration and color calibration affect resulting high-dynamic-range images.

== Process ==
High-dynamic-range photographs are generally composites of multiple standard dynamic range images, often captured using exposure bracketing. Afterwards, photo manipulation software merges the input files into a single HDR image, which is then also tone mapped in accordance with the limitations of the planned output or display.

=== Capturing multiple images (exposure bracketing) ===
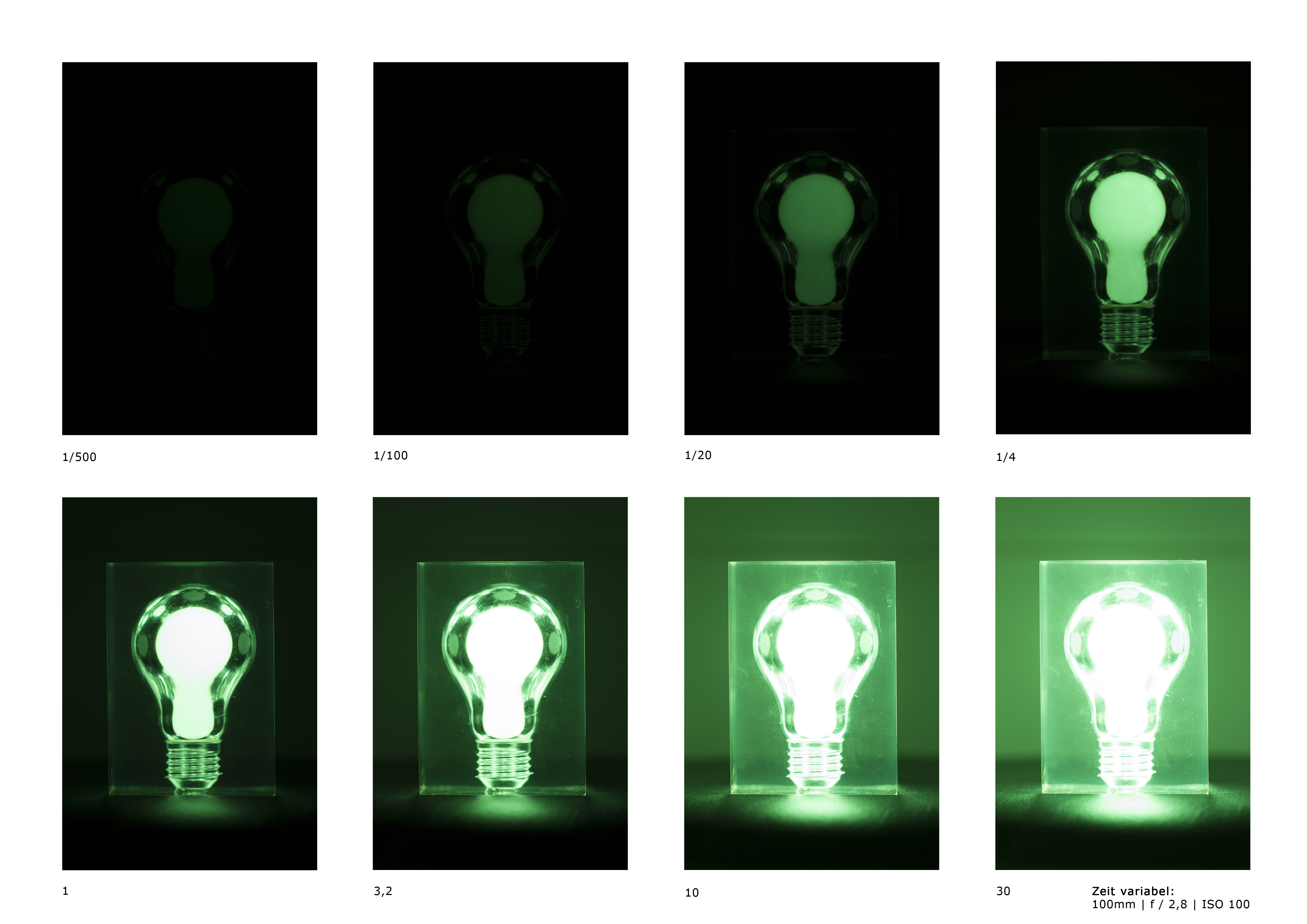
Exposure bracketing by varying the shutter speed from 1/500 to 30 seconds

Any camera that allows manual exposure control can perform multi-exposure HDR image capture, although one equipped with automatic exposure bracketing (AEB) facilitates the process. Some cameras have an AEB feature that spans a far greater dynamic range than others, from ±0.6 in simpler cameras to ±18 EV in top professional cameras, as of 2020.

The exposure value (EV) refers to the amount of light applied to the light-sensitive detector, whether film or digital sensor such as a CCD. An increase or decrease of one stop is defined as a doubling or halving of the amount of light captured. Revealing detail in the darkest of shadows requires an increased EV, while preserving detail in very bright situations requires very low EVs.

EV is controlled using one of two photographic controls: varying either the size of the aperture or the exposure time. A set of images with multiple EVs intended for HDR processing should be captured only by altering the exposure time; altering the aperture size also would affect the depth of field and so the resultant multiple images would be quite different, preventing their final combination into a single HDR image.

Multi-exposure HDR photography generally is limited to still scenes because any movement between successive images will impede or prevent success in combining them afterward. Also, because the photographer must capture three or more images to obtain the desired luminance range, taking such a full set of images takes extra time. Photographers have developed calculation methods and techniques to partially overcome these problems, but the use of a sturdy tripod is advised to minimize framing differences between exposures.

=== Merging the images into an HDR image ===
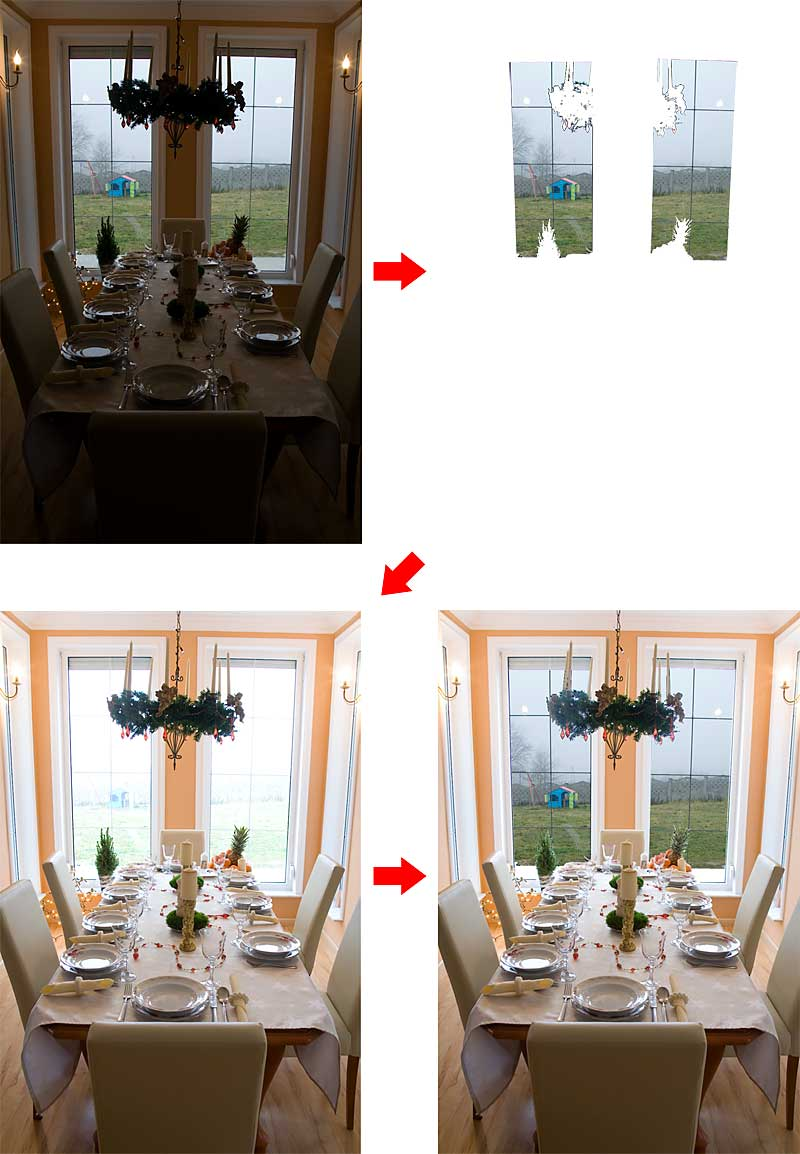
Highlight areas from the window (upper right) are extracted from an underexposed image (upper left) and composited with a scene-averaged exposure (bottom left) to produce a HDR image (bottom right).

Tonal information and details from shadow areas can be recovered from images that are deliberately overexposed (i.e., with positive EV compared to the correct scene exposure), while similar tonal information from highlight areas can be recovered from images that are deliberately underexposed (negative EV). The process of selecting and extracting shadow and highlight information from these over/underexposed images and then combining them with image(s) that are exposed correctly for the overall scene is known as exposure fusion. Exposure fusion can be performed manually, relying on the HDR operator's judgment, experience, and training, but usually, fusion is performed automatically by software.

=== Storing ===
Information stored in high-dynamic-range images typically corresponds to the physical values of luminance or radiance that can be observed in the real world. This is different from traditional digital images, which represent colors as they should appear on a monitor or a paper print. Therefore, HDR image formats are often called scene-referred, in contrast to traditional digital images, which are device-referred or output-referred. Furthermore, traditional images are usually encoded for the human visual system (maximizing the visual information stored in the fixed number of bits), which is usually called gamma encoding or gamma correction. The values stored for HDR images are often gamma compressed using mathematical functions such as power laws logarithms, or floating point linear values, since fixed-point linear encodings are increasingly inefficient over higher dynamic ranges.

HDR images often do not use fixed ranges per color channel, other than traditional images, to represent many more colors over a much wider dynamic range (multiple channels). For that purpose, they do not use integer values to represent the single color channels (e.g., 0–255 in an 8 bit per pixel interval for red, green and blue) but instead use a floating point representation. Common values are 16-bit (half precision) or 32-bit floating-point numbers to represent HDR pixels. However, when the appropriate transfer function is used, HDR pixels for some applications can be represented with a color depth that has as few as 10 to 12 bits (1024 to 4096 values) for luminance and 8 bits (256 values) for chrominance without introducing any visible quantization artifacts.

=== Tone mapping ===
Tone mapping reduces the dynamic range, or contrast ratio, of an entire image while retaining localized contrast. Although it is a distinct operation, tone mapping is often applied to HDR files by the same software package.

Tone mapping is often needed because the dynamic range that can be displayed is often lower than the dynamic range of the captured or processed image. HDR displays can display image at a higher dynamic range than SDR displays, reducing the need for tone mapping.

=== Types of HDR ===
HDR can be done via several methods:

- DOL: Digital overlap
- BME: Binned multiplexed exposure
- SME: Spatially multiplexed exposure
- QBC: Quad Bayer Coding

=== Examples ===
This is an example of four standard dynamic range images that are combined to produce three resulting tone mapped images:

Exposed images:

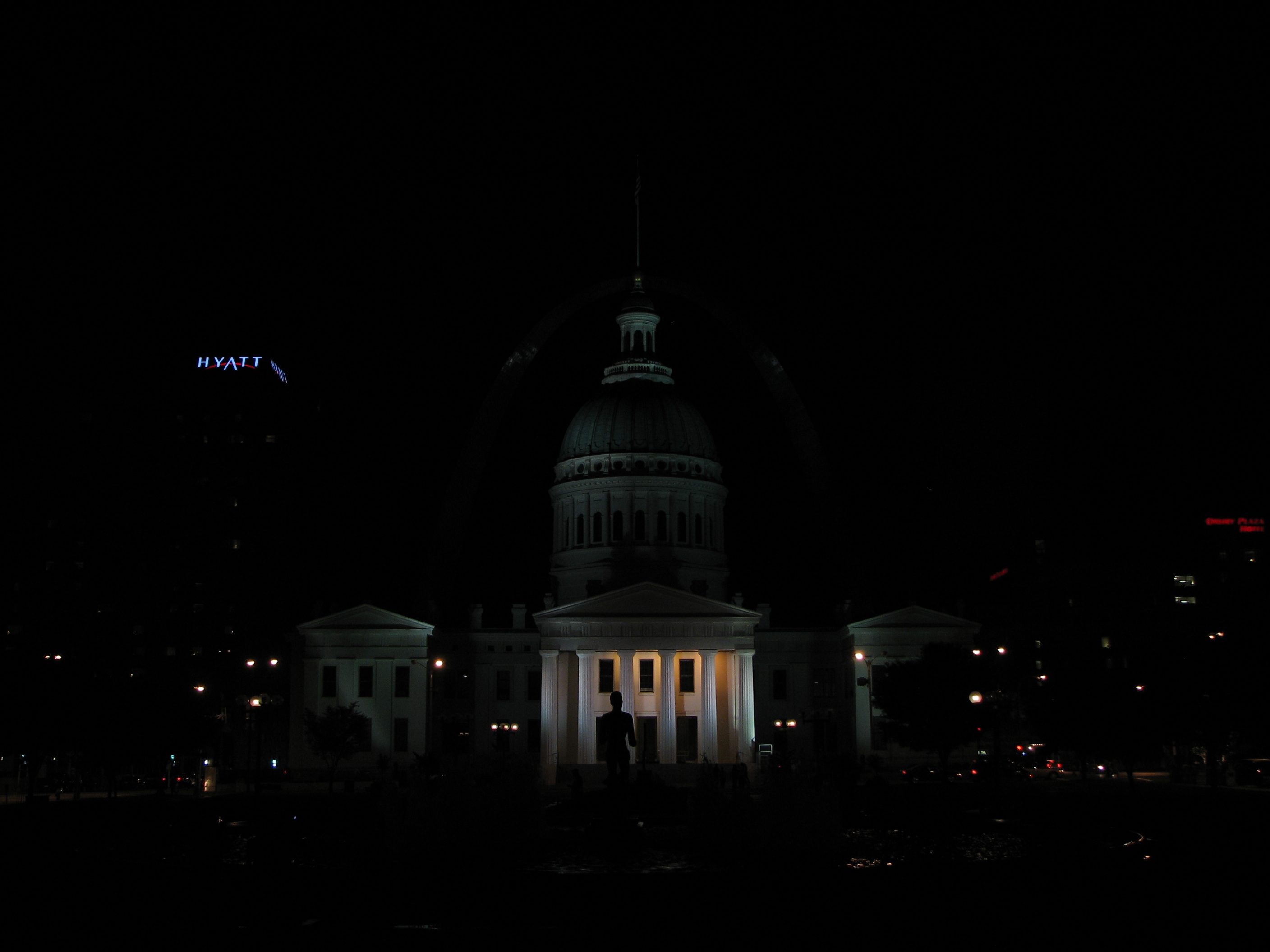
–4 stops

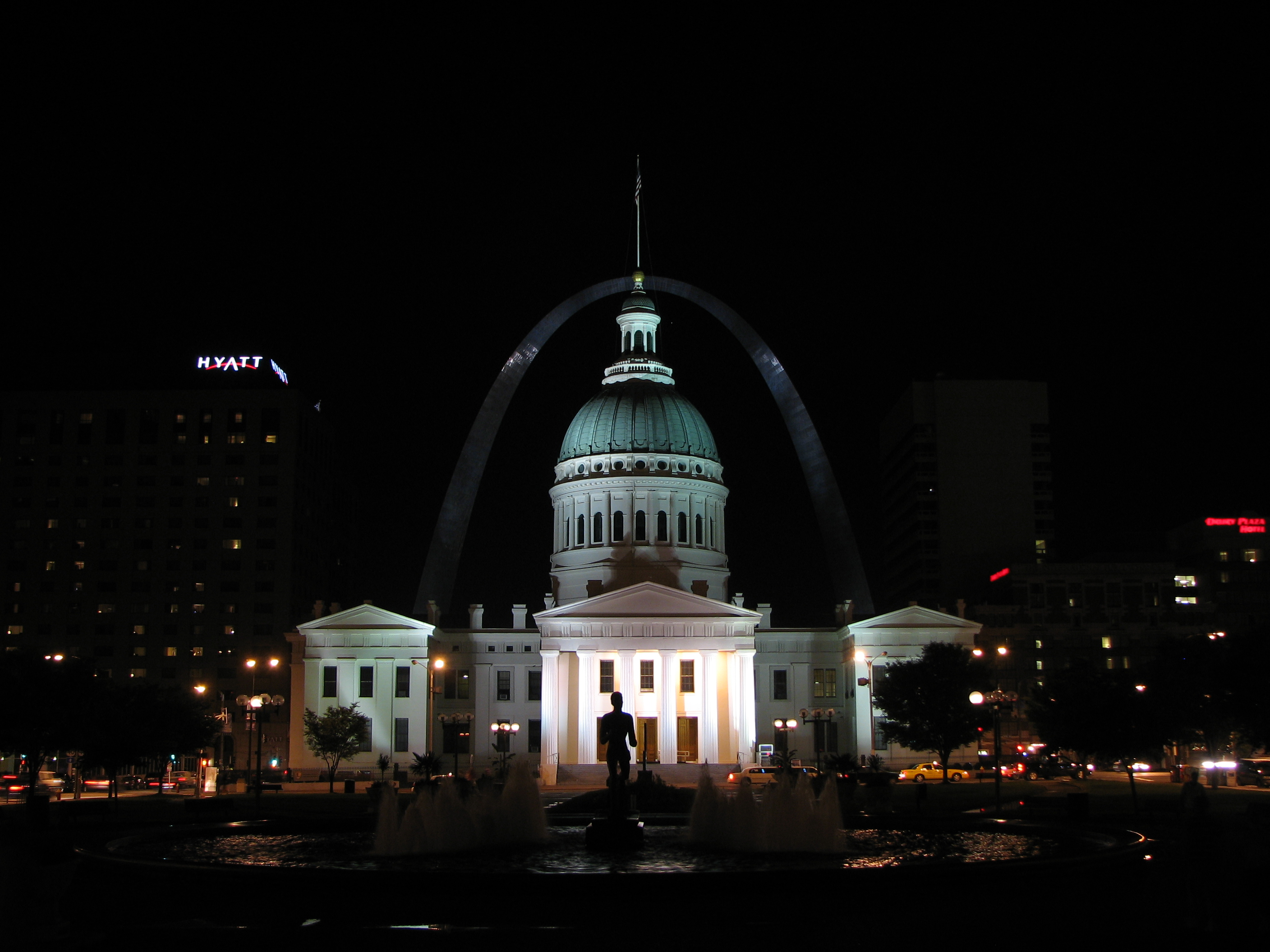
–2 stops

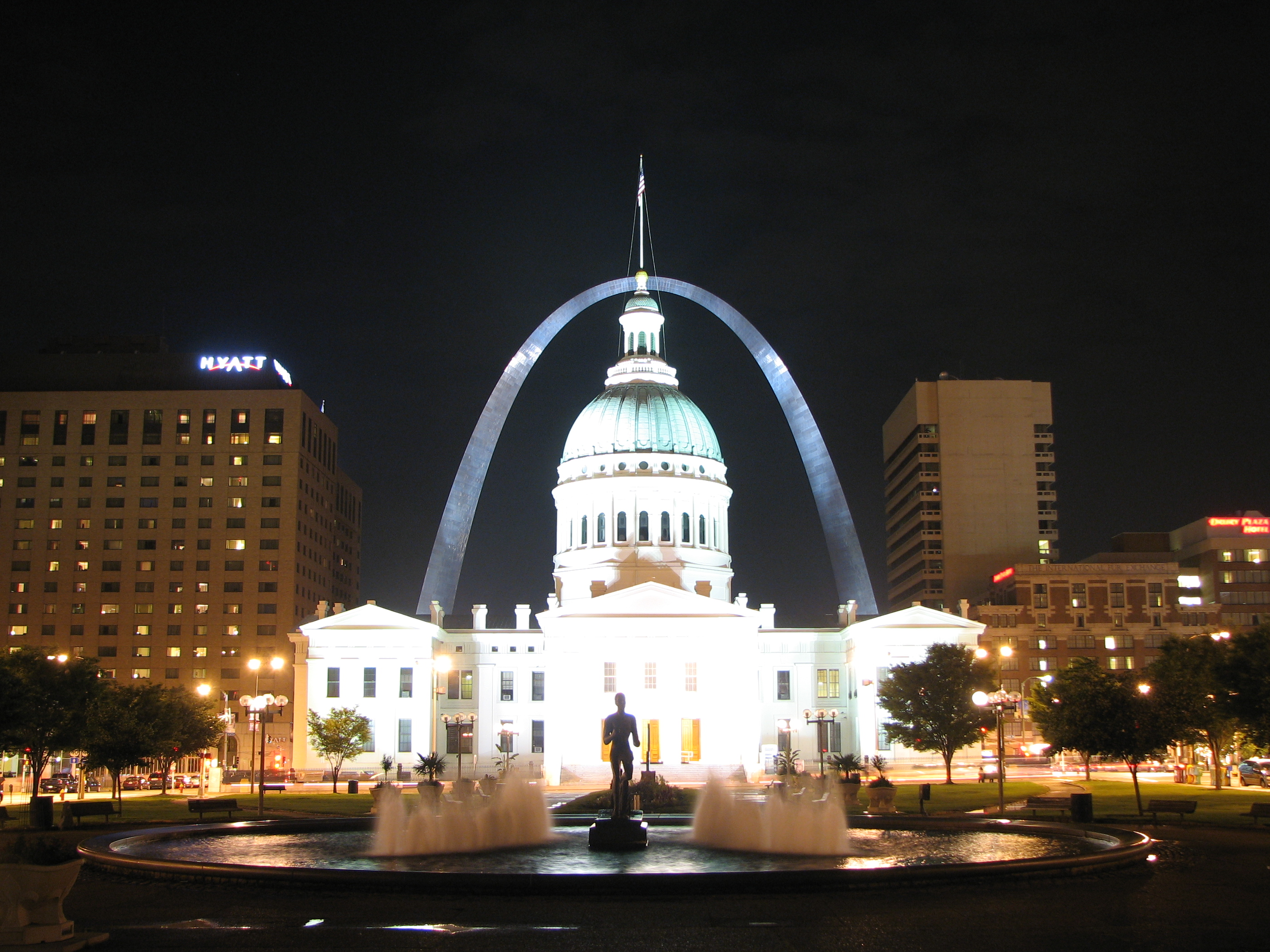
+2 stops

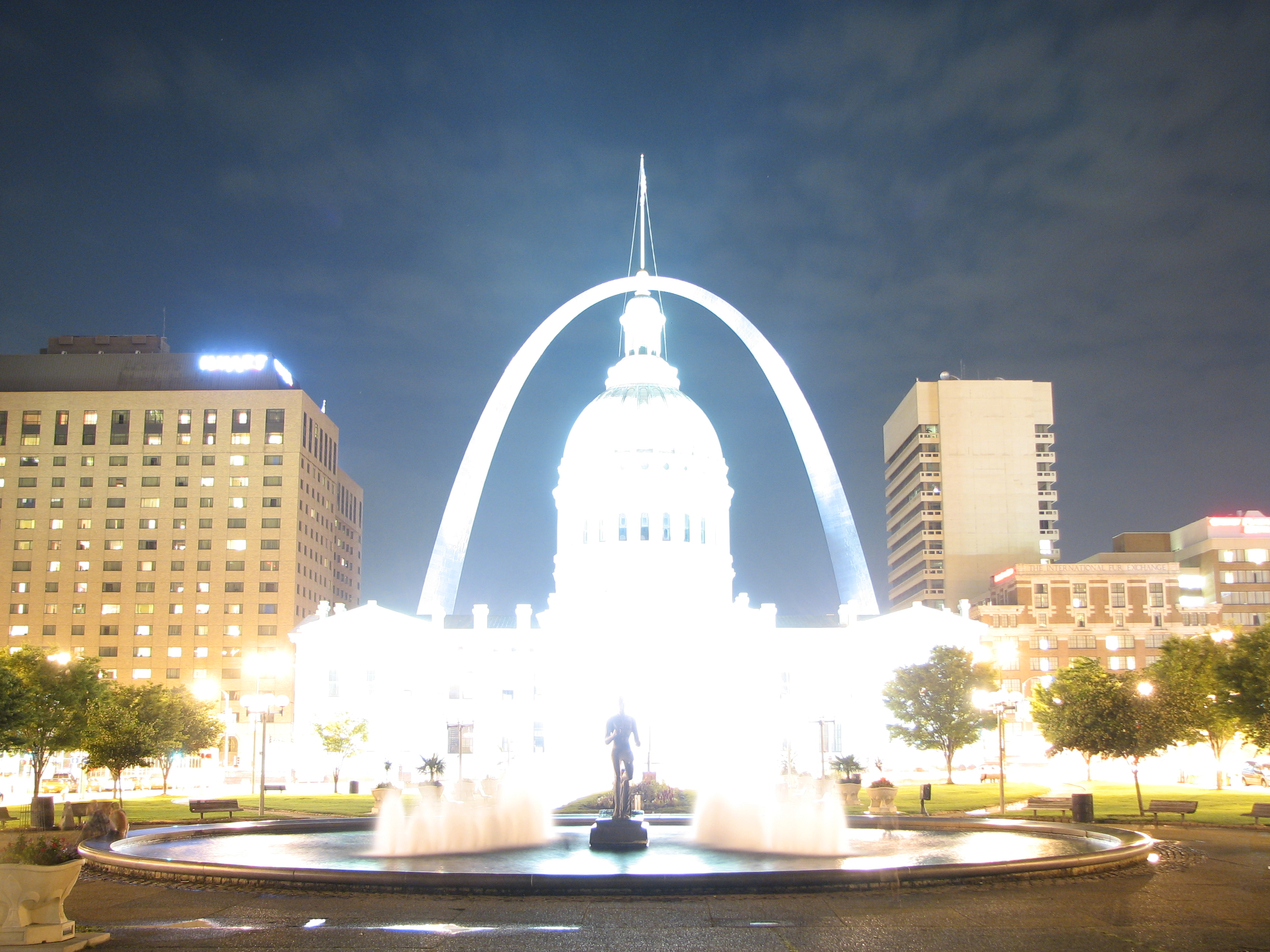
+4 stops
Results after processing:

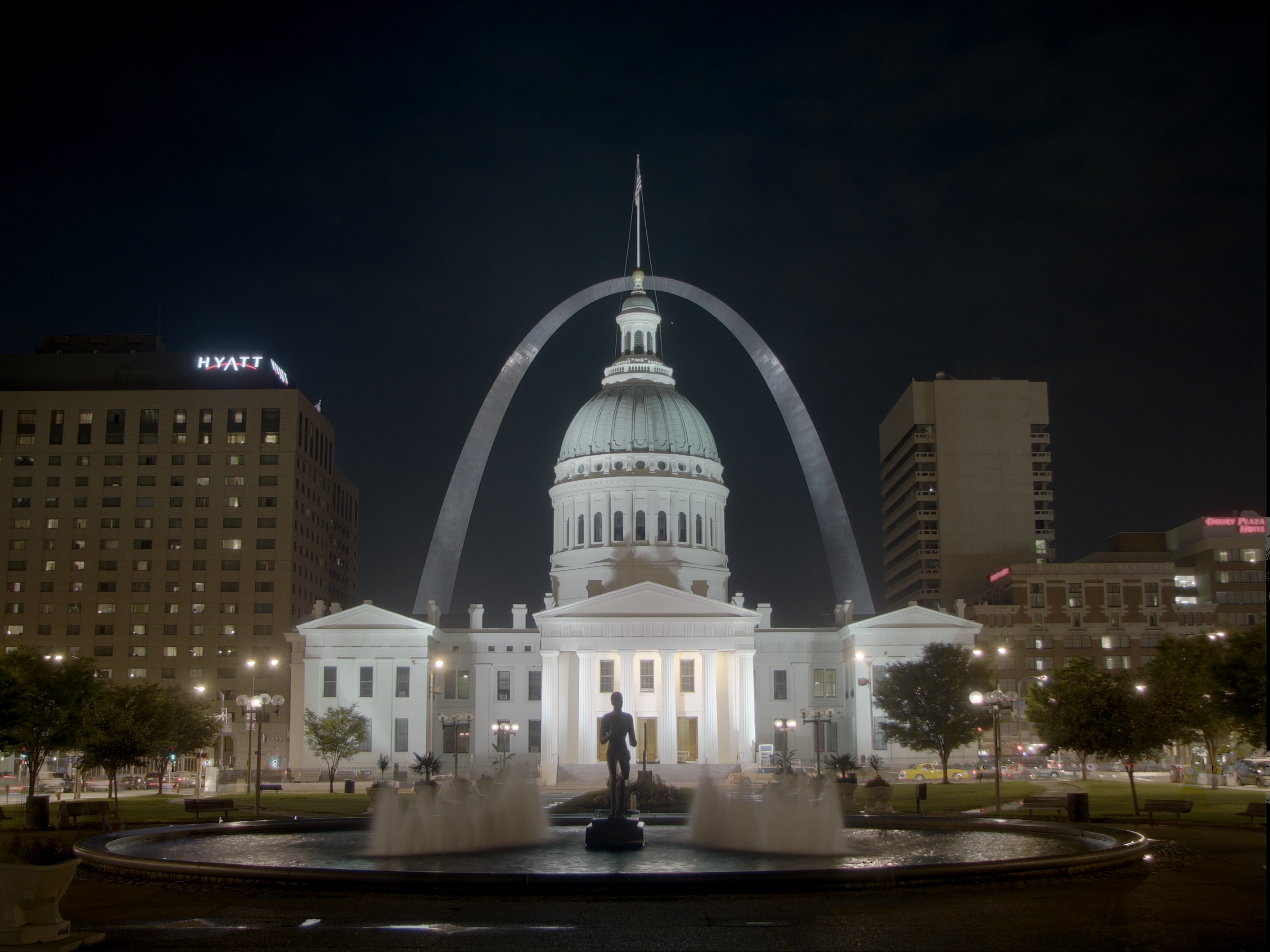
Simple contrast reduction

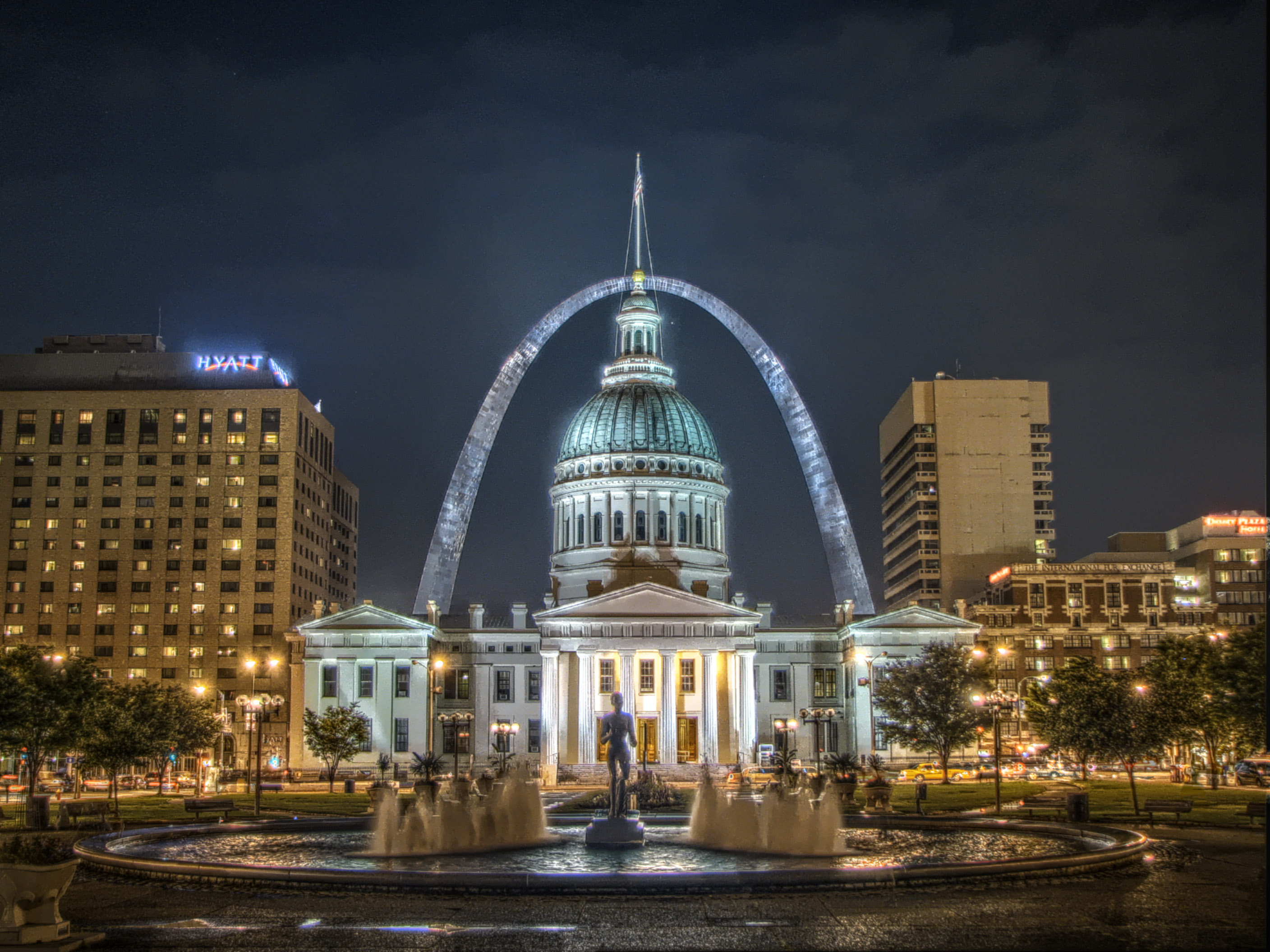
Local tone mapping

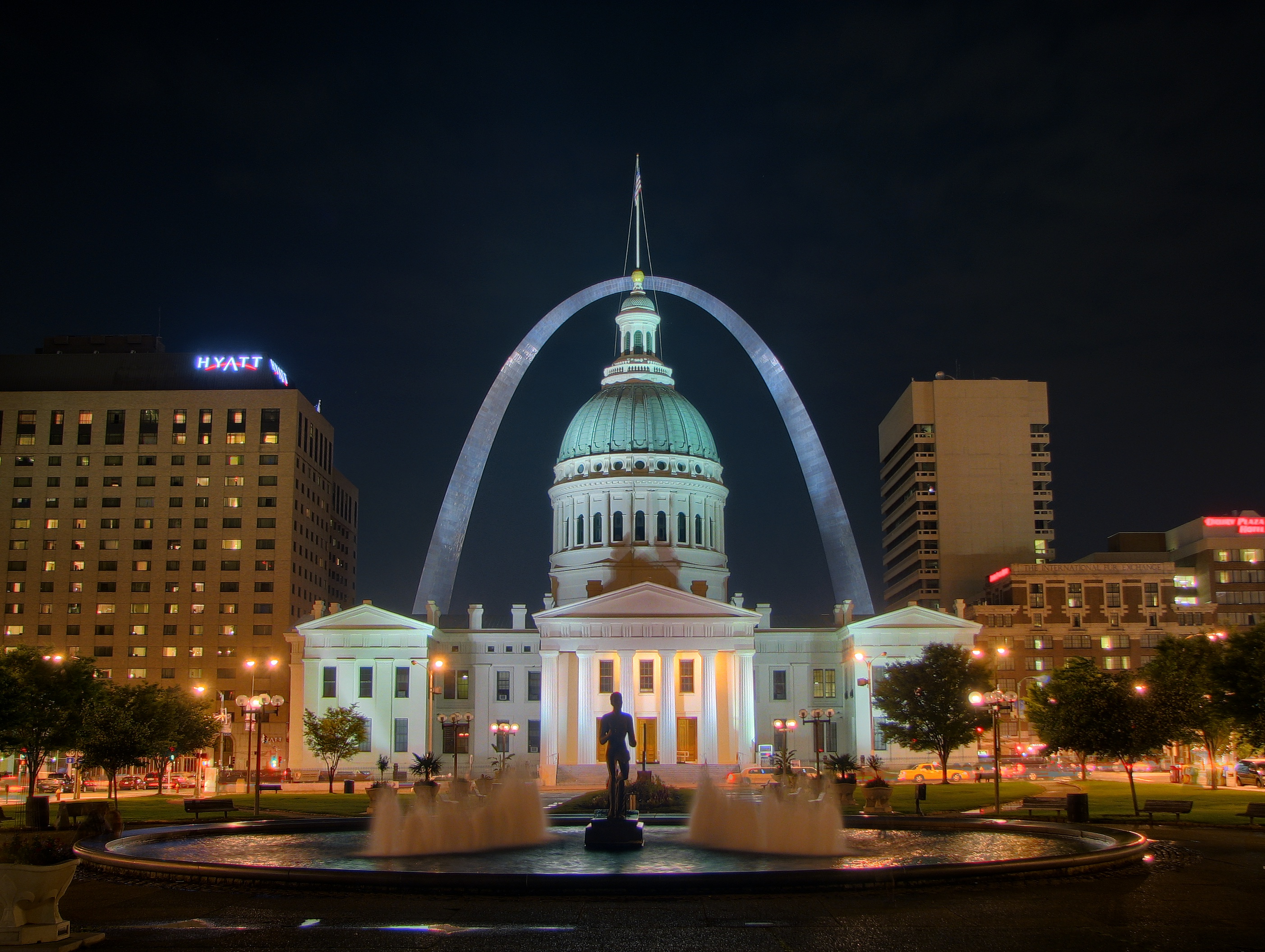
Natural tone mapping

This is an example of a scene with a very wide dynamic range:

Exposed images:

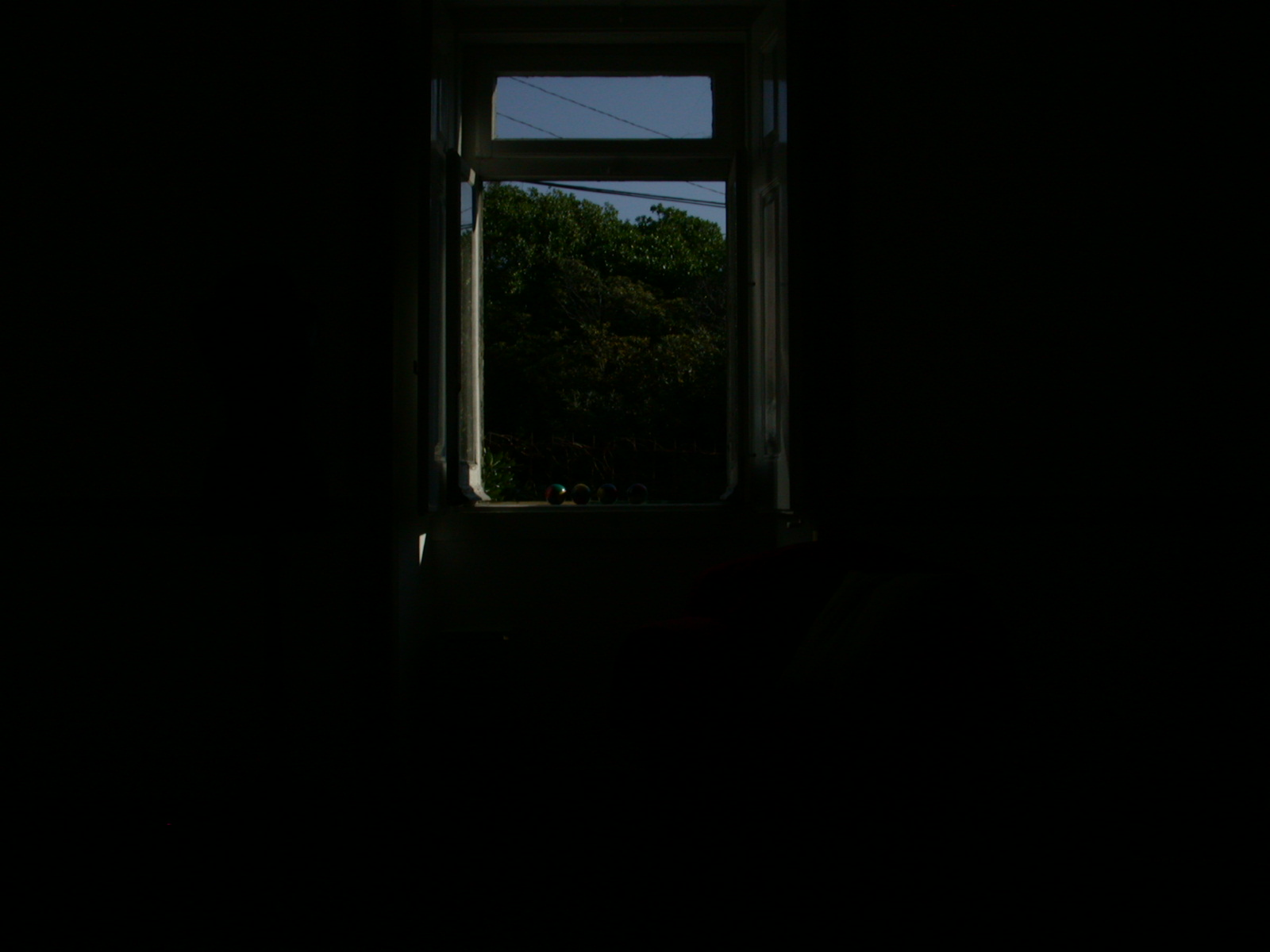
–6 stops

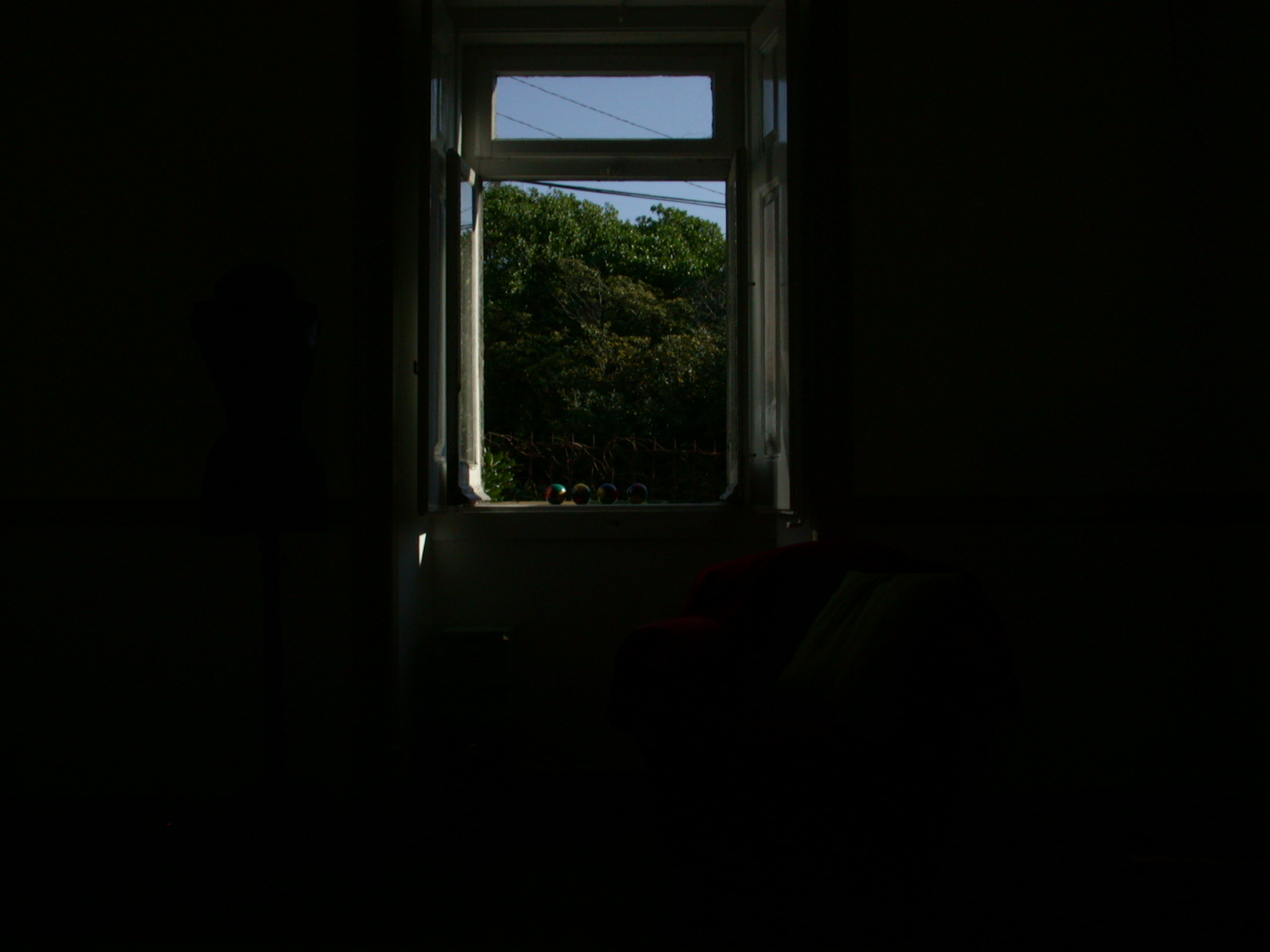
–5 stops

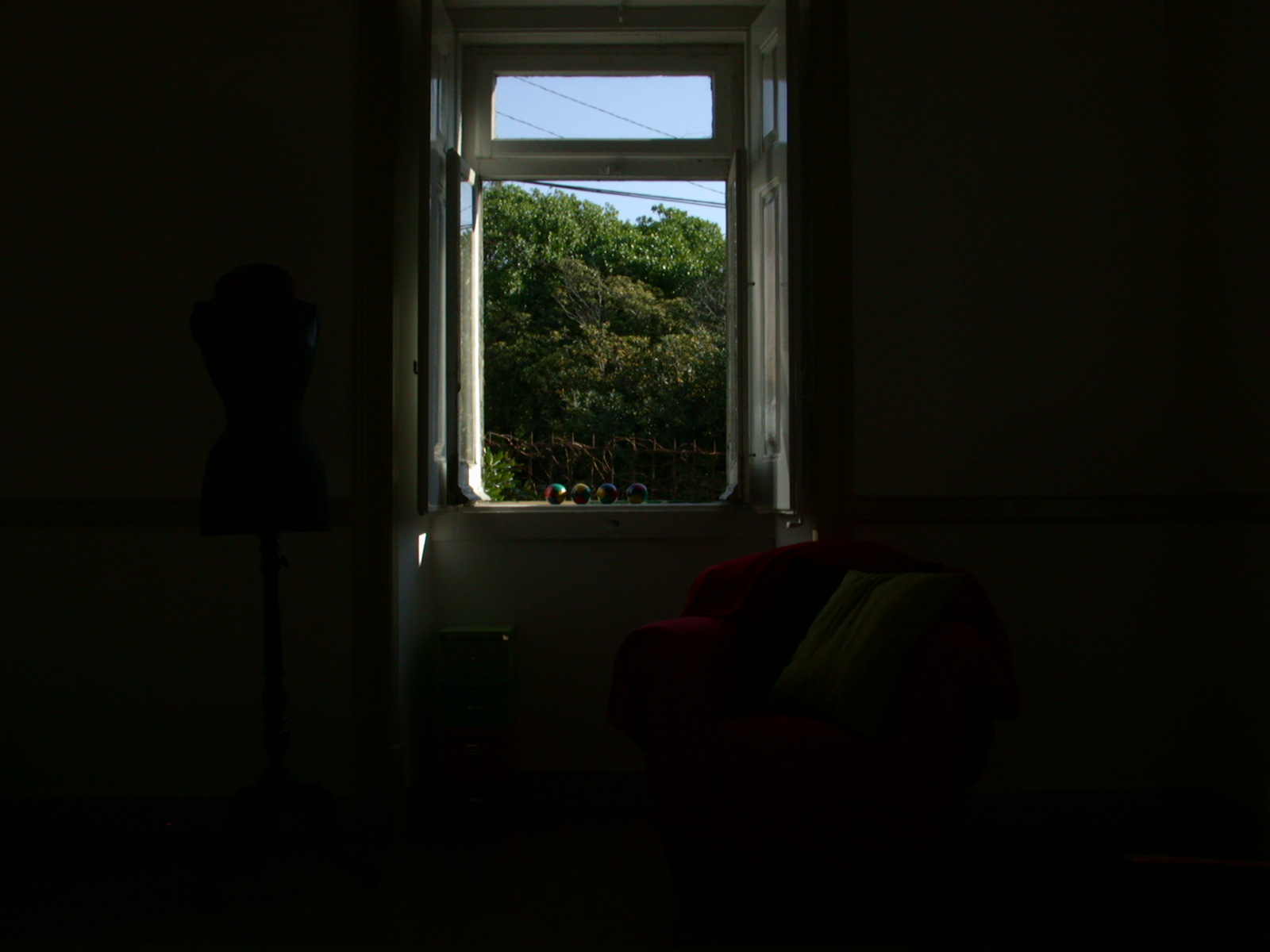
–4 stops

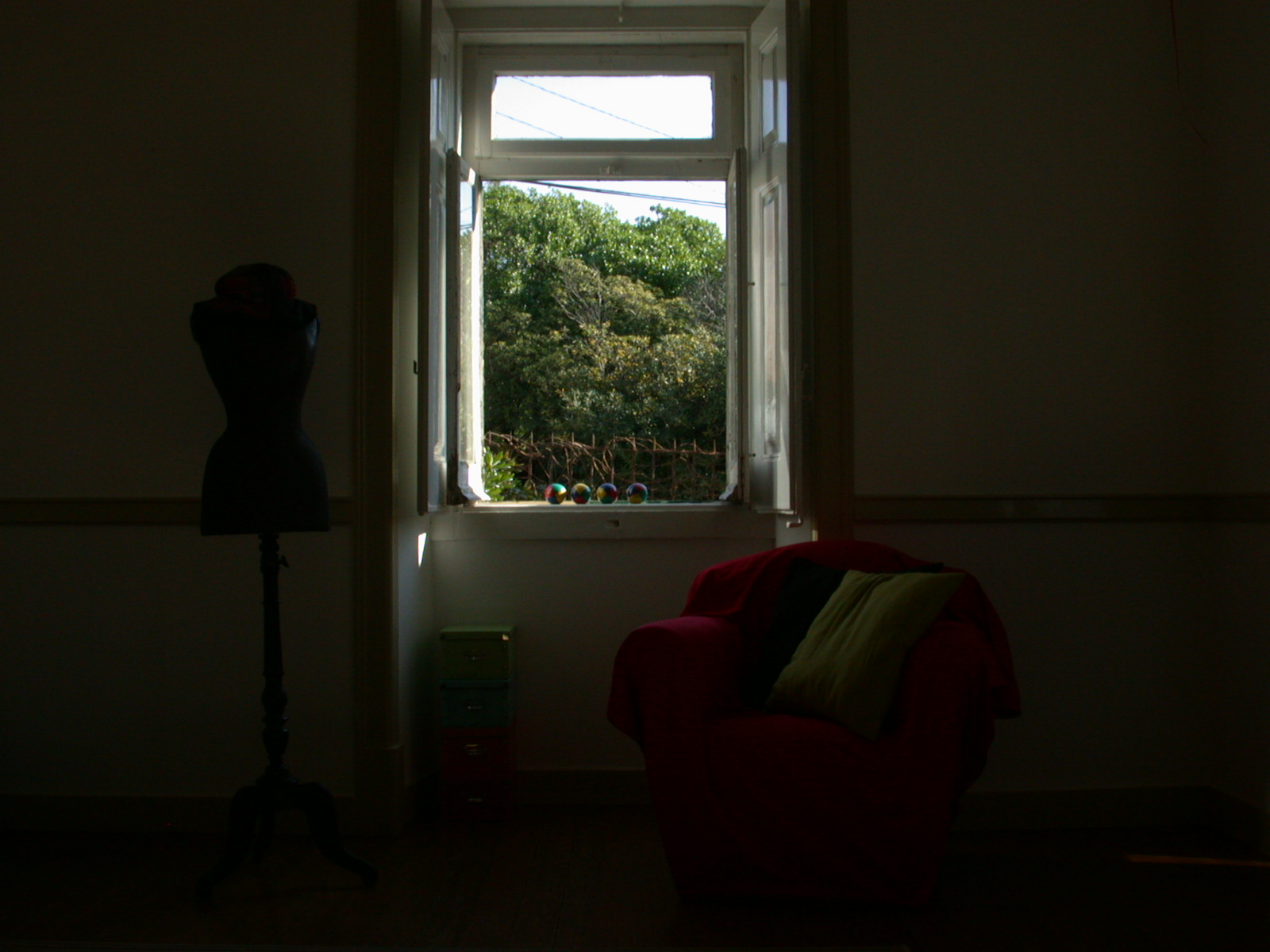
–3 stops

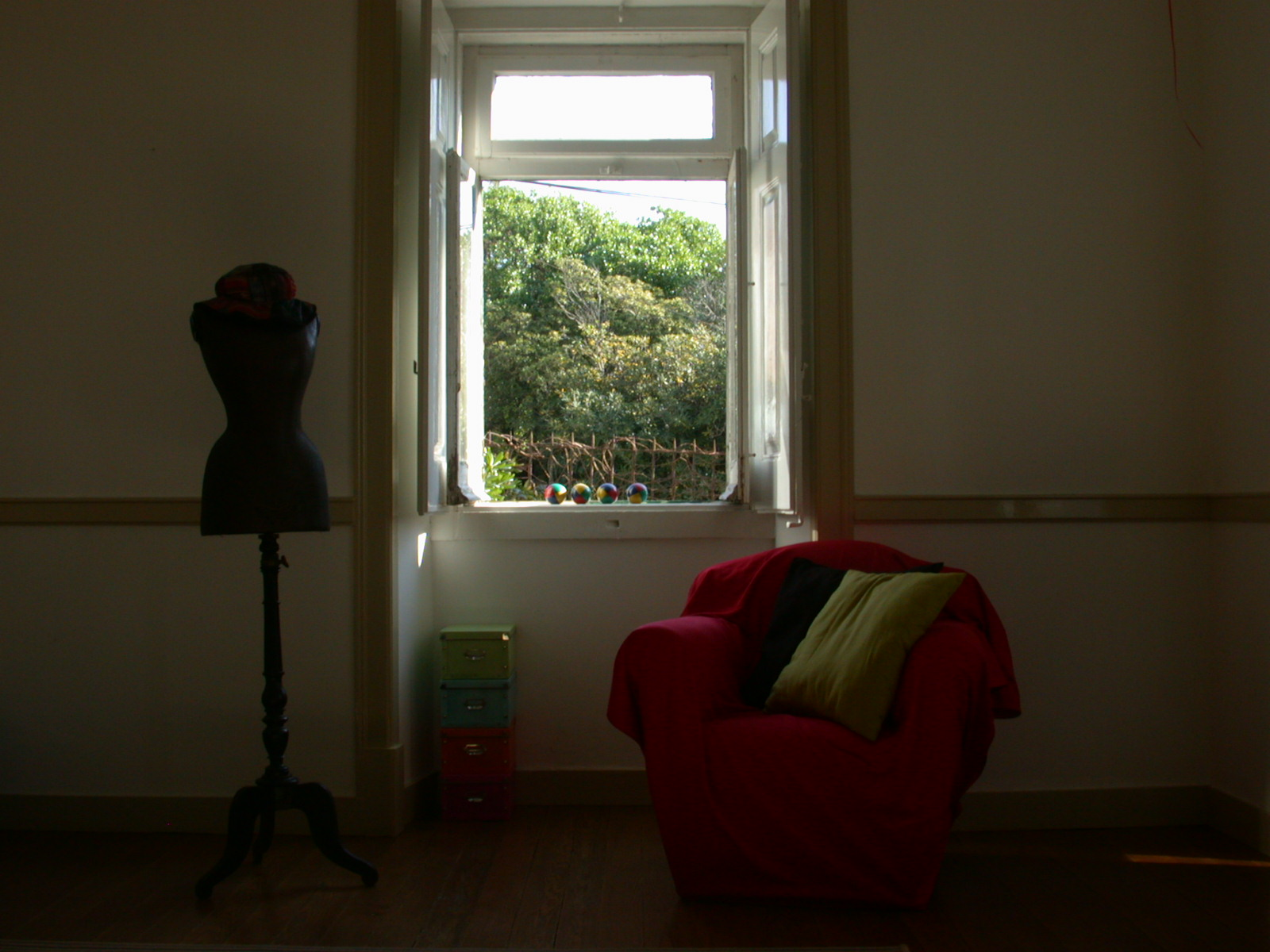
–2 stops

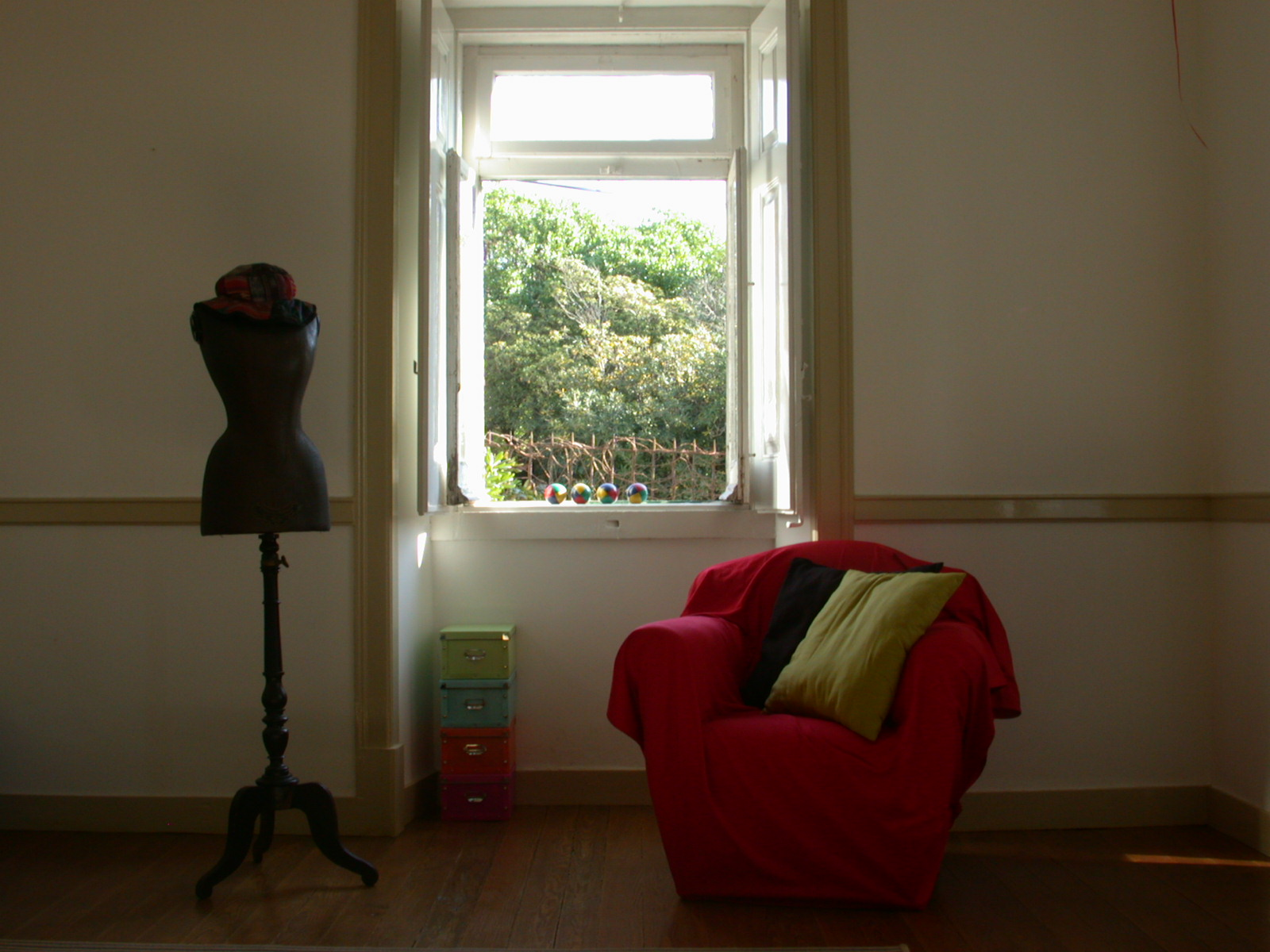
–1 stops

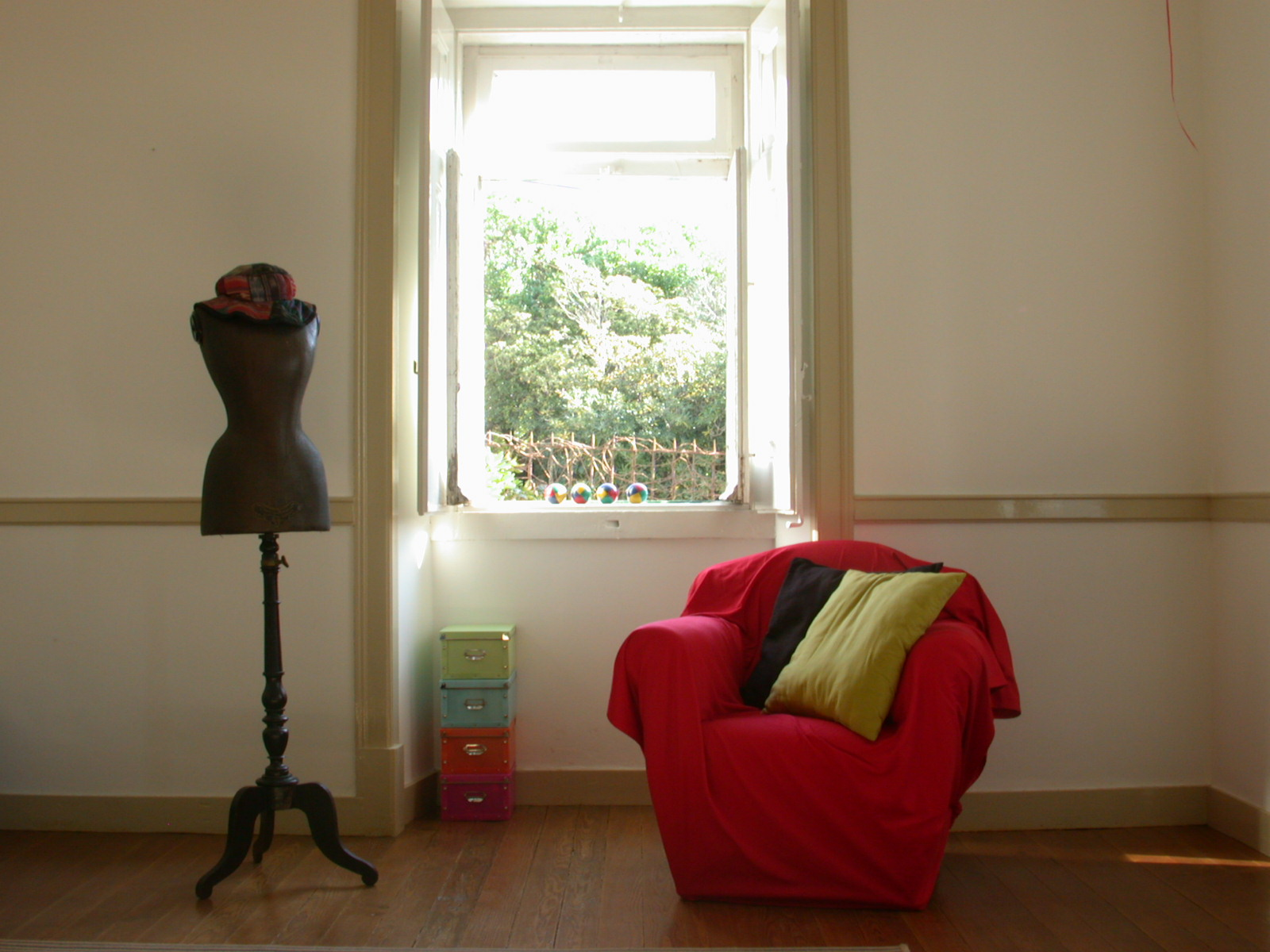
0 stops

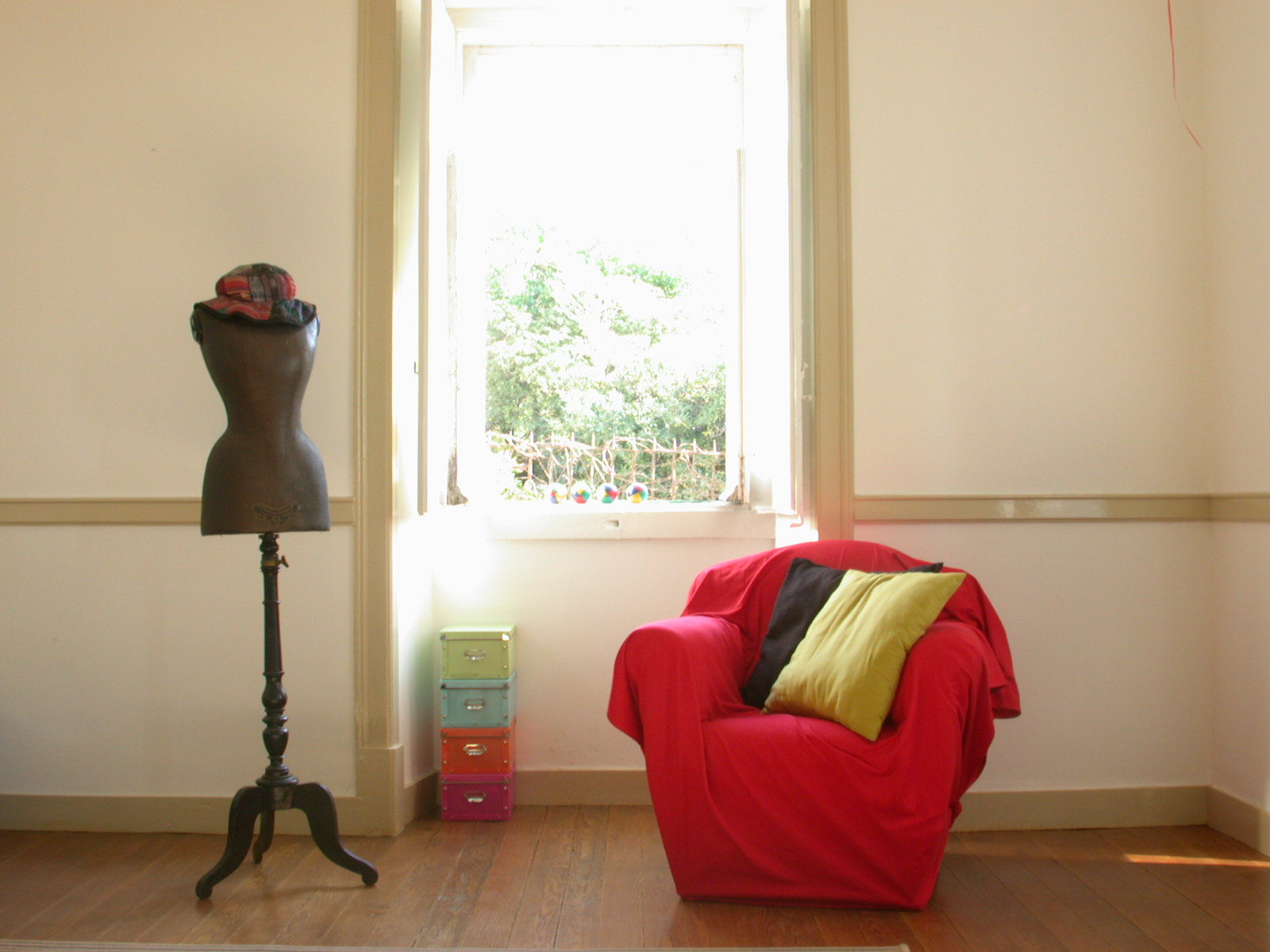
+1 stops

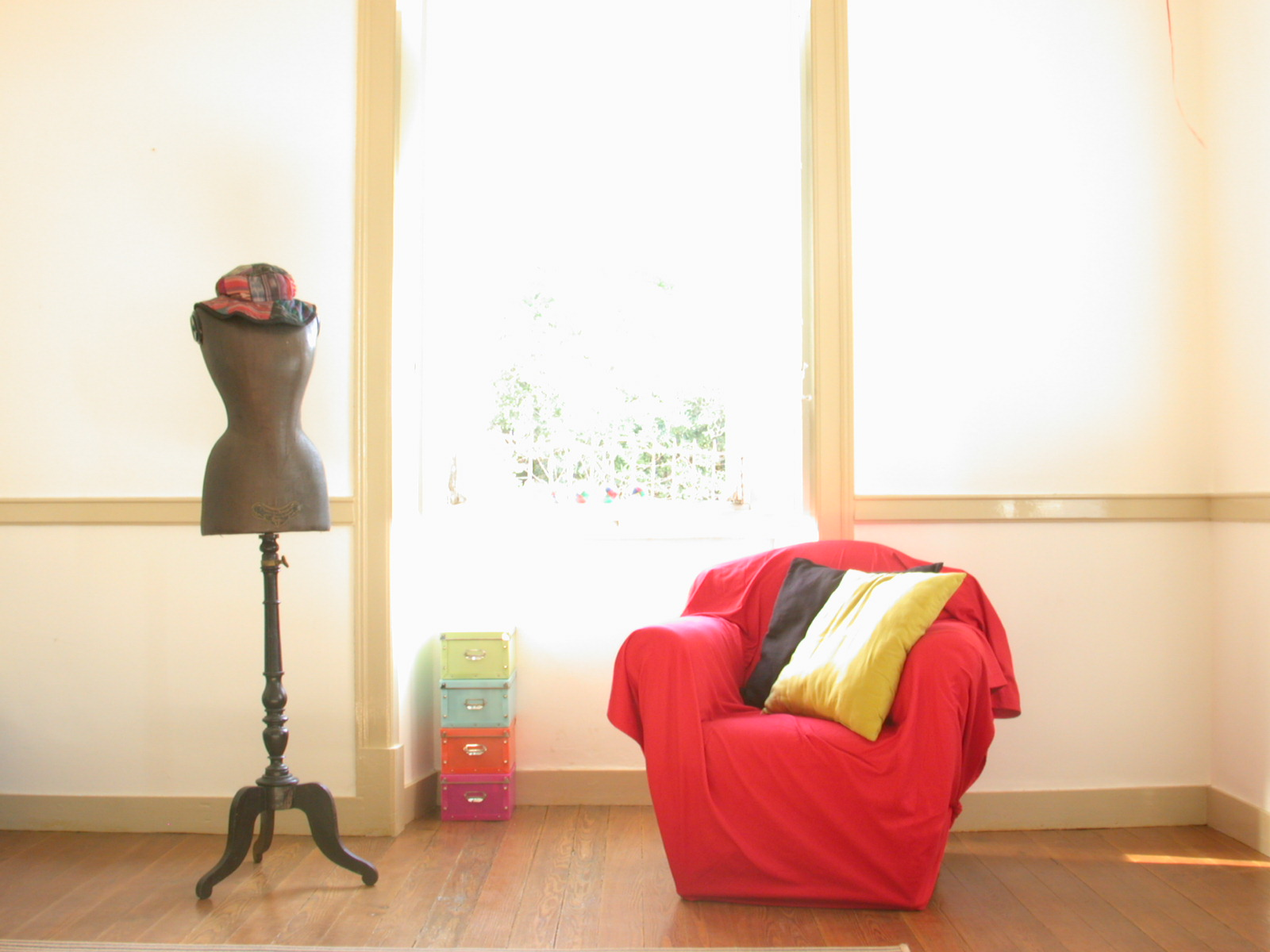
+2 stops

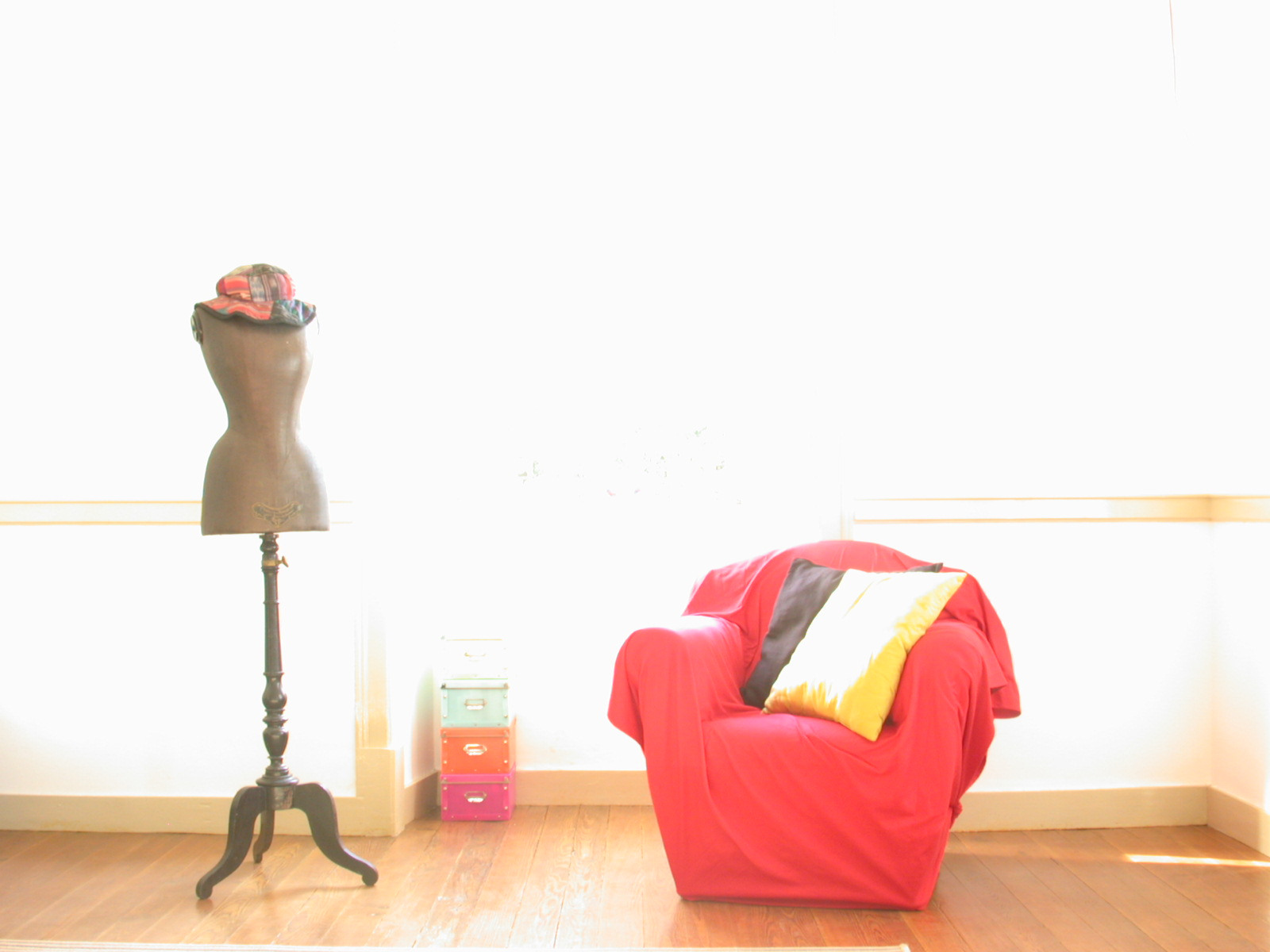
+3 stops

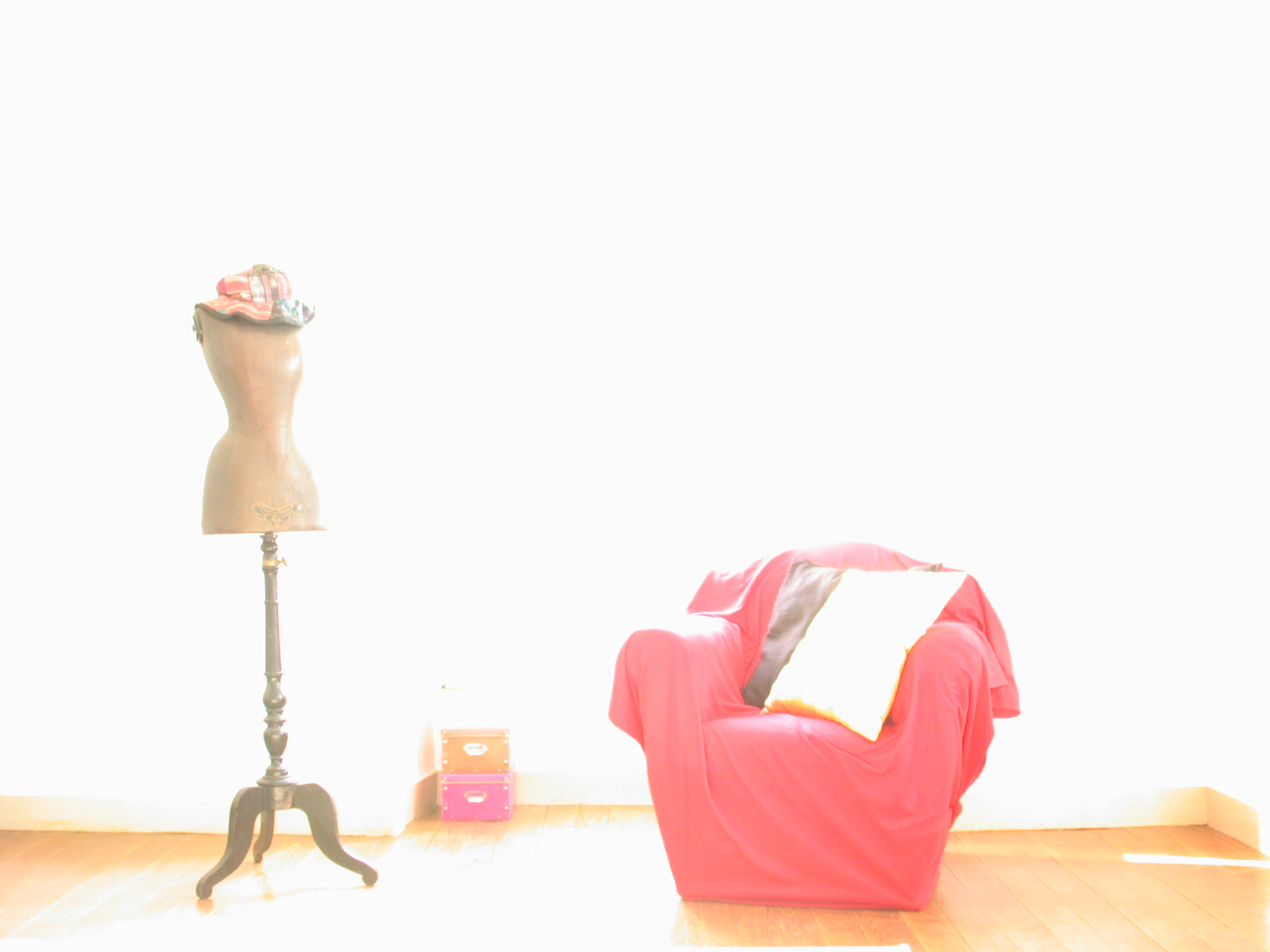
+4 stops

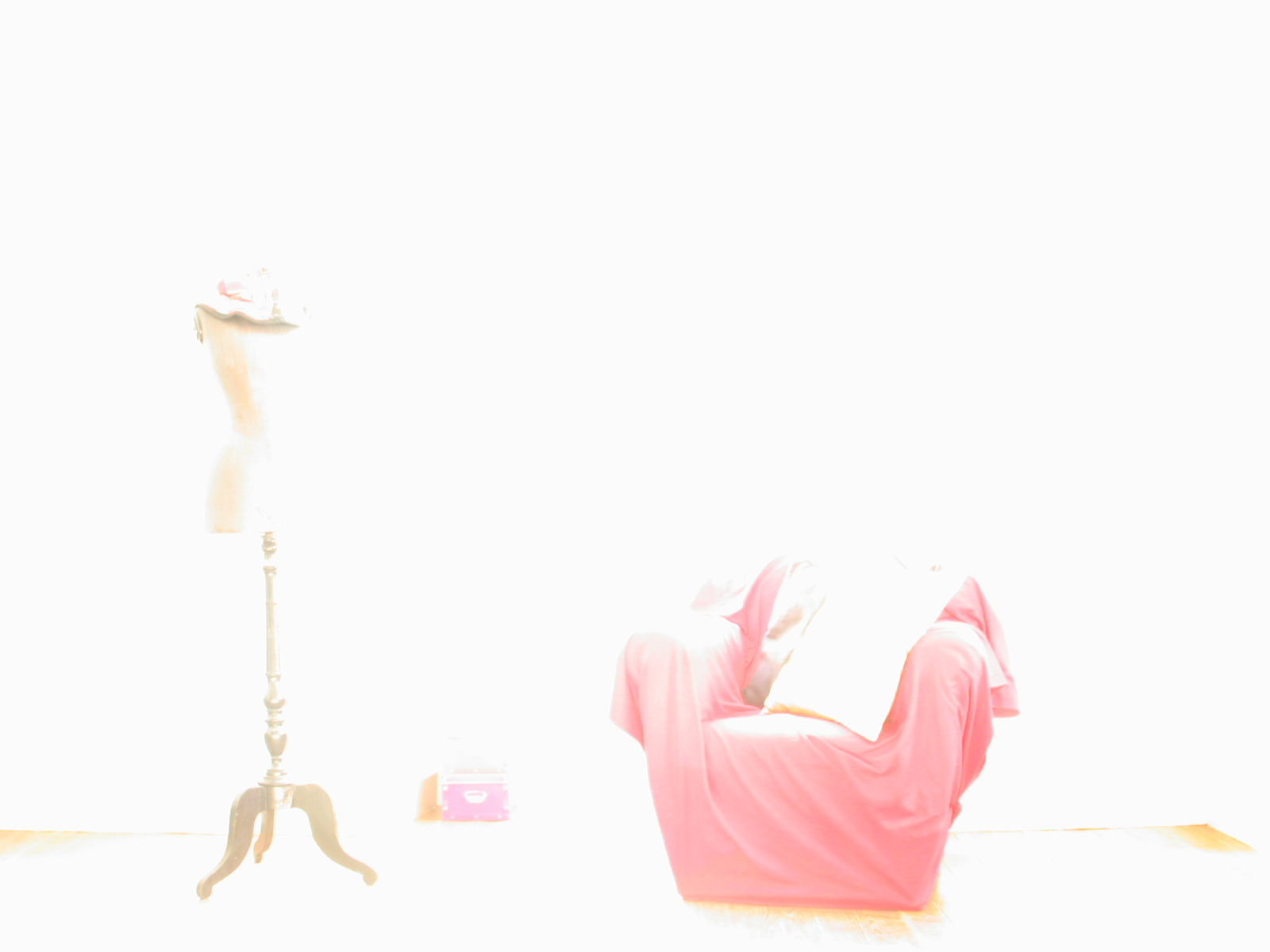
+5 stops
Results after processing:

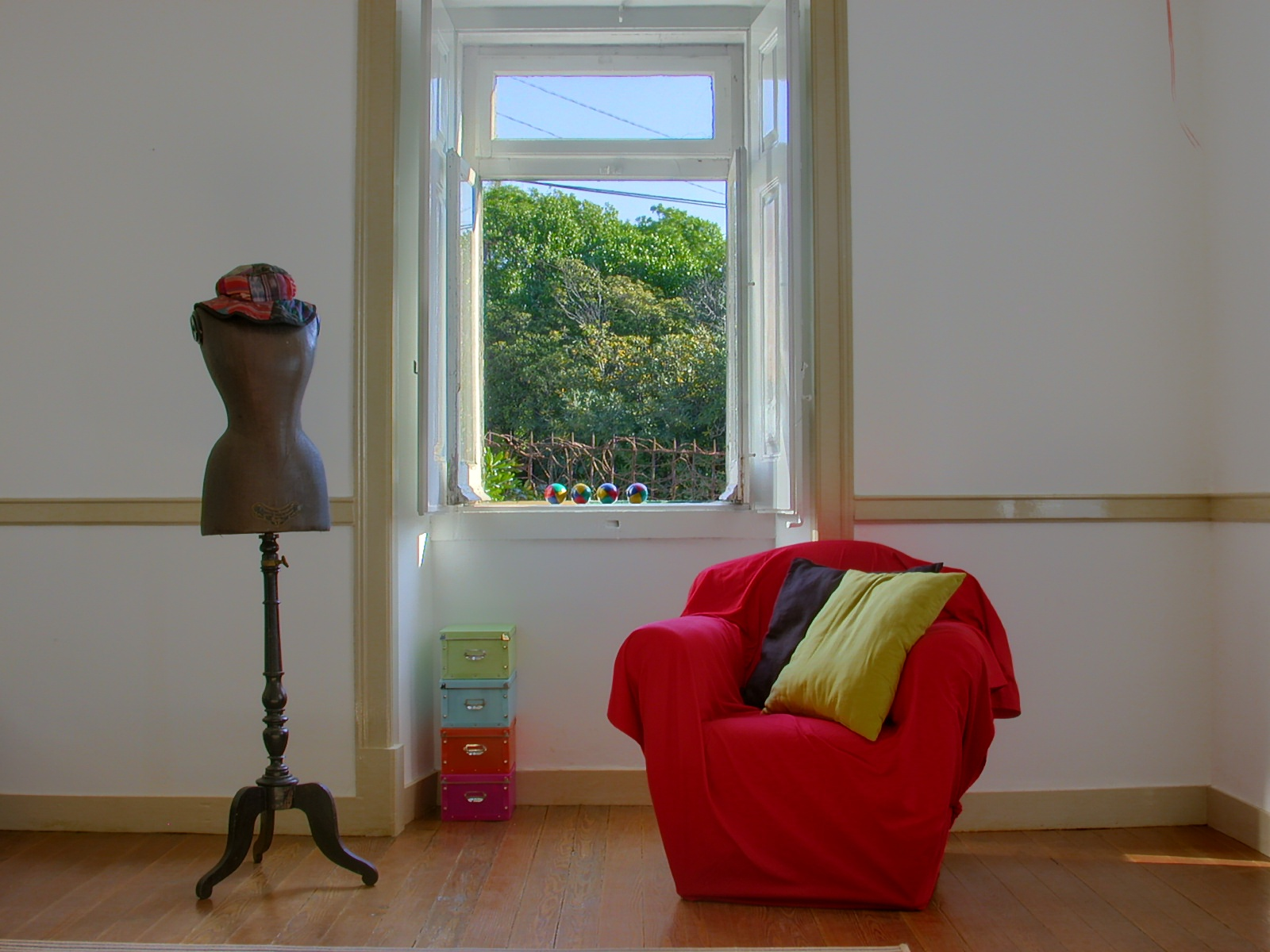
Natural tone mapping

== Devices ==
=== Post-capture software ===
Several software applications are available on the PC, Mac, and Linux platforms for producing HDR files and tone mapped images. Notable titles include:

- Adobe Photoshop
- Affinity Photo
- Aurora HDR
- Dynamic Photo HDR
- EasyHDR
- GIMP
- HDR PhotoStudio
- Luminance HDR
- Nik Collection HDR Efex Pro
- Oloneo PhotoEngine
- Photomatix Pro
- PTGui
- SNS-HDR

=== Photography ===
Several camera manufacturers offer built-in multi-exposure HDR features. For example, the Pentax K-7 DSLR has an HDR mode that makes 3 or 5 exposures and outputs (only) a tone mapped HDR image in a JPEG file. The Canon PowerShot G12, Canon PowerShot S95, and Canon PowerShot S100 offer similar features in a smaller format. Nikon's approach is called 'Active D-Lighting' which applies exposure compensation and tone mapping to the image as it comes from the sensor, with the emphasis being on creating a realistic effect.

Some smartphones provide HDR modes for their cameras, and most mobile platforms have apps that provide multi-exposure HDR picture taking. Google released an HDR+ mode for the Nexus 5 and Nexus 6 smartphones in 2014, which automatically captures a series of images and combines them into a single still image, as detailed by Marc Levoy. Unlike traditional HDR, Levoy's implementation of HDR+ uses multiple images underexposed by using a short shutter speed, which are then aligned and averaged by pixel, improving dynamic range and reducing noise. By selecting the sharpest image as the baseline for alignment, the effect of camera shake is reduced.

Some of the sensors on modern phones and cameras may combine two images on-chip so that a wider dynamic range without in-pixel compression is directly available to the user for display or processing.

=== Videography ===
Example of HDR time-lapse video

Although not as established as for still photography capture, it is also possible to capture and combine multiple images for each frame of a video in order to increase the dynamic range captured by the camera. This can be done via multiple methods:

- Creating a time-lapse of individually images created via the multi-exposure HDR technique.
- Taking consecutively two differently exposed images by cutting the frame rate in half.
- Taking simultaneously two differently exposed images by cutting the resolution in half.
- Taking simultaneously two differently exposed images with full resolution and frame rate via a sensor with dual gain architecture. For example: Arri Alexa's sensor, Samsung sensors with Smart-ISO Pro.

Some cameras designed for use in security applications can automatically provide two or more images for each frame, with changing exposure. For example, a sensor for 30fps video will give out 60fps with the odd frames at a short exposure time and the even frames at a longer exposure time.

In 2020, Qualcomm announced Snapdragon 888, a mobile SoC able to do computational multi-exposure HDR video capture in 4K and also to record it in a format compatible with HDR displays.

In 2021, the Xiaomi Mi 11 Ultra smartphone is able to do computational multi-exposure HDR for video capture.

=== Surveillance cameras ===
HDR capture can be implemented on surveillance cameras, even inexpensive models. This is usually termed a wide dynamic range (WDR) function Examples include CarCam Tiny, Prestige DVR-390, and DVR-478.

== History ==
=== Mid-19th century ===
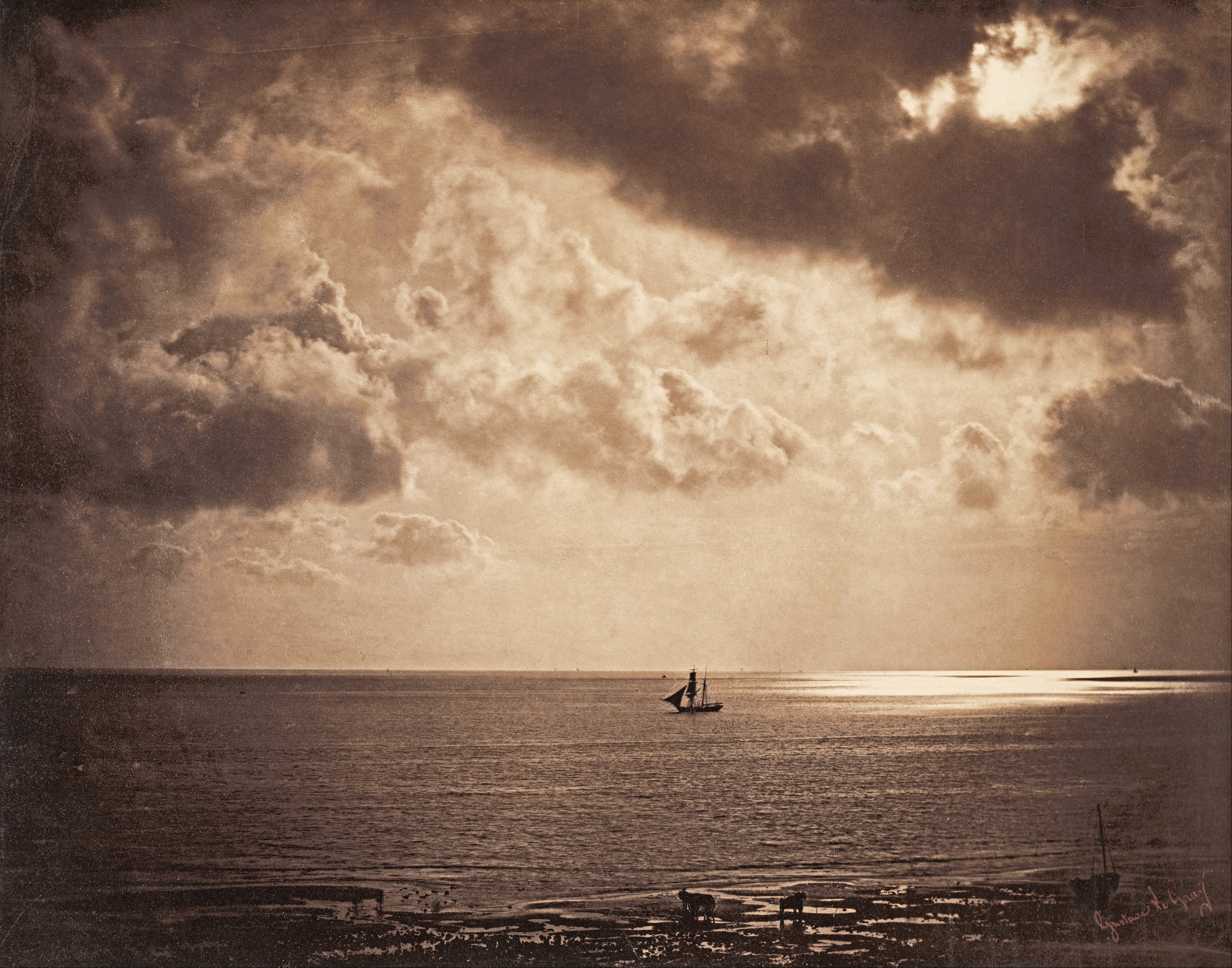
An 1856 photo by Gustave Le Gray

The idea of using several exposures to adequately reproduce a too-extreme range of luminance was pioneered as early as the 1850s by Gustave Le Gray to render seascapes showing both the sky and the sea. Such rendering was impossible at the time using standard methods, as the luminosity range was too extreme. Le Gray used one negative for the sky, and another one with a longer exposure for the sea, and combined the two into one picture in positive.

=== Mid-20th century ===
External image
- Schweitzer at the Lamp, by W. Eugene Smith

Manual tone mapping was accomplished by dodging and burning – selectively increasing or decreasing the exposure of regions of the photograph to yield better tonality reproduction. This was effective because the dynamic range of the negative is significantly higher than would be available on the finished positive paper print when that is exposed via the negative in a uniform manner. An excellent example is the photograph Schweitzer at the Lamp by W. Eugene Smith, from his 1954 photo essay A Man of Mercy on Albert Schweitzer and his humanitarian work in French Equatorial Africa. The image took five days to reproduce the tonal range of the scene, which ranges from a bright lamp (relative to the scene) to a dark shadow.

Ansel Adams elevated dodging and burning to an art form. Many of his famous prints were manipulated in the darkroom with these two methods. Adams wrote a comprehensive book on producing prints called The Print, which prominently features dodging and burning, in the context of his Zone System.

With the advent of color photography, tone mapping in the darkroom was no longer possible due to the specific timing needed during the developing process of color film. Photographers looked to film manufacturers to design new film stocks with improved response, or continued to shoot in black and white to use tone mapping methods.

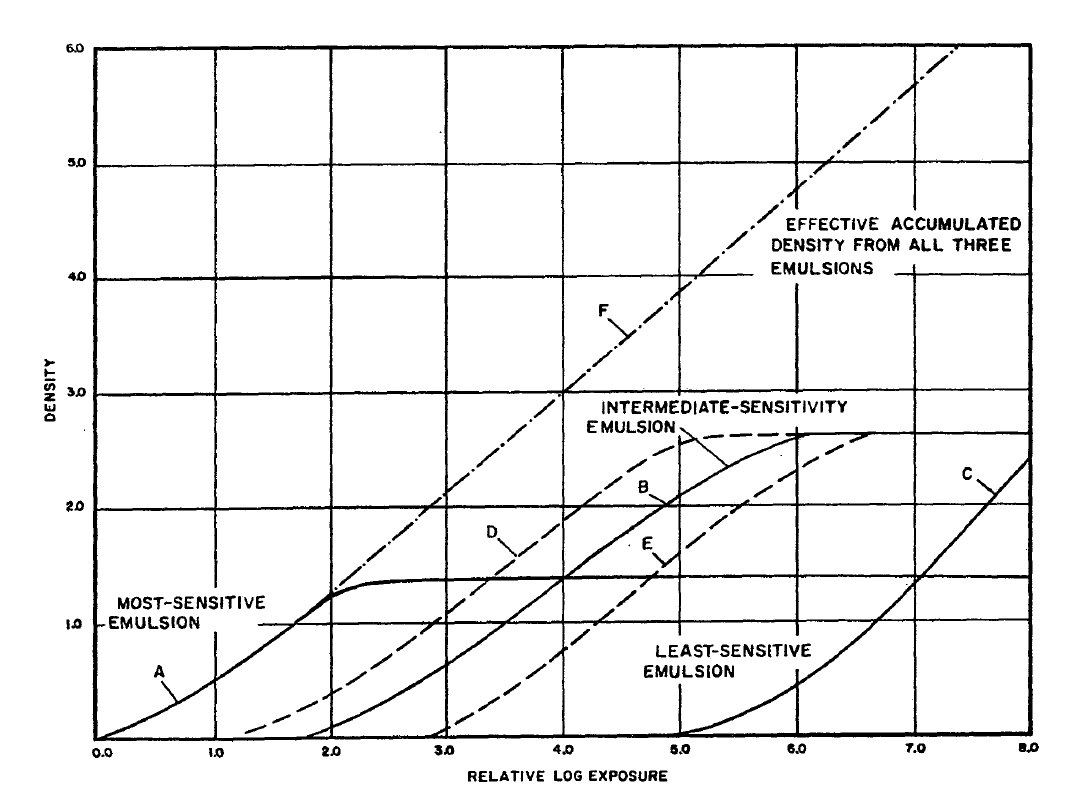
Exposure/density characteristics of Wyckoff's extended exposure response film. One can note that each curve has a sigmoidal shape and follows a hyperbolic tangent, or a logistic function characterized by an induction period (initiation), a quasi-linear propagation, and a saturation plateau (asymptote).

Color film capable of directly recording high-dynamic-range images was developed by Charles Wyckoff and EG&G "in the course of a contract with the Department of the Air Force". This XR film had three emulsion layers, an upper layer having an ASA speed rating of 400, a middle layer with an intermediate rating, and a lower layer with an ASA rating of 0.004. The film was processed in a manner similar to color films, and each layer produced a different color. The dynamic range of this extended range film has been estimated as 1:10^{8}. It has been used to photograph nuclear explosions, for astronomical photography, for spectrographic research, and for medical imaging. Wyckoff's detailed pictures of nuclear explosions appeared on the cover of Life magazine in the mid-1950s.

=== Late 20th century ===
Georges Cornuéjols and licensees of his patents (Brdi, Hymatom) introduced the principle of HDR video image, in 1986, by interposing a matricial LCD screen in front of the camera's image sensor, increasing the sensors dynamic by five stops. The concept of neighborhood tone mapping was applied to video cameras in 1988 by a group from the Technion in Israel, led by Oliver Hilsenrath and Yehoshua Y. Zeevi. Technion researchers filed for a patent on this concept in 1991, and several related patents in 1992 and 1993. In February and April 1990, Georges Cornuéjols introduced the first real-time HDR camera that combined two images captured successively by a sensor or simultaneously by two sensors of the camera. This process is known as bracketing used for a video stream. In 1991, the first commercial video camera was introduced that performed real-time capturing of multiple images with different exposures, and producing an HDR video image, by Hymatom, licensee of Georges Cornuéjols. Also in 1991, Georges Cornuéjols introduced the HDR+ image principle by non-linear accumulation of images to increase the sensitivity of the camera: for low-light environments, several successive images are accumulated, thus increasing the signal-to-noise ratio.

In 1993, another commercial medical camera producing an HDR video image, by the Technion. Modern HDR imaging uses a completely different approach, based on making a high-dynamic-range luminance or light map using only global image operations (across the entire image), and then tone mapping the result. Global HDR was first introduced in 1993 resulting in a mathematical theory of differently exposed pictures of the same subject matter that was published in 1995 by Steve Mann and Rosalind Picard.

On October 28, 1998, Ben Sarao created one of the first nighttime HDR+G (high dynamic range + graphic) image of STS-95 on the launch pad at NASA's Kennedy Space Center. It consisted of four film images of the space shuttle at night that were digitally composited with additional digital graphic elements. The image was first exhibited at NASA Headquarters Great Hall, Washington DC, in 1999 and then published in Hasselblad Forum.

The advent of consumer digital cameras produced a new demand for HDR imaging to improve the light response of digital camera sensors, which had a much smaller dynamic range than film. Steve Mann developed and patented the global-HDR method for producing digital images having extended dynamic range at the MIT Media Lab. Mann's method involved a two-step procedure: First, generate one floating point image array by global-only image operations (operations that affect all pixels identically, without regard to their local neighborhoods). Second, convert this image array, using local neighborhood processing (tone-remapping, etc.), into an HDR image. The image array generated by the first step of Mann's process is called a lightspace image, lightspace picture, or radiance map. Another benefit of global-HDR imaging is that it provides access to the intermediate light or radiance map, which has been used for computer vision, and other image processing operations.

=== 21st century ===
In February 2001, the Dynamic Ranger technique was demonstrated, using multiple photos with different exposure levels to accomplish high dynamic range similar to the naked eye.

In the early 2000s, several scholarly research efforts used consumer-grade sensors and cameras. A few companies such as RED and Arri have been developing digital sensors capable of a higher dynamic range. RED EPIC-X can capture time-sequential HDRx images with a user-selectable 1–3 stops of additional highlight latitude in the "x" channel. The "x" channel can be merged with the normal channel in post production software. The Arri Alexa camera uses a dual-gain architecture to generate an HDR image from two exposures captured at the same time.

With the advent of low-cost consumer digital cameras, many amateurs began posting tone-mapped HDR time-lapse videos on the Internet, essentially a sequence of still photographs in quick succession. In 2010, the independent studio Soviet Montage produced an example of HDR video from disparately exposed video streams using a beam splitter and consumer grade HD video cameras. Similar methods have been described in the academic literature in 2001 and 2007.

In 2005, Adobe Systems introduced several new features in Photoshop CS2 including Merge to HDR, 32 bit floating point image support, and HDR tone mapping.

On June 30, 2016, Microsoft added support for the digital compositing of HDR images to Windows 10 using the Universal Windows Platform.

== See also ==
- Comparison of graphics file formats
- HDRi (data format)
- High-dynamic-range rendering
- High-dynamic-range television
- JPEG XT
- Logluv TIFF
- OpenEXR
- RGBE image format
- scRGB
- Wide dynamic range
