= Skylum =

Software developing company

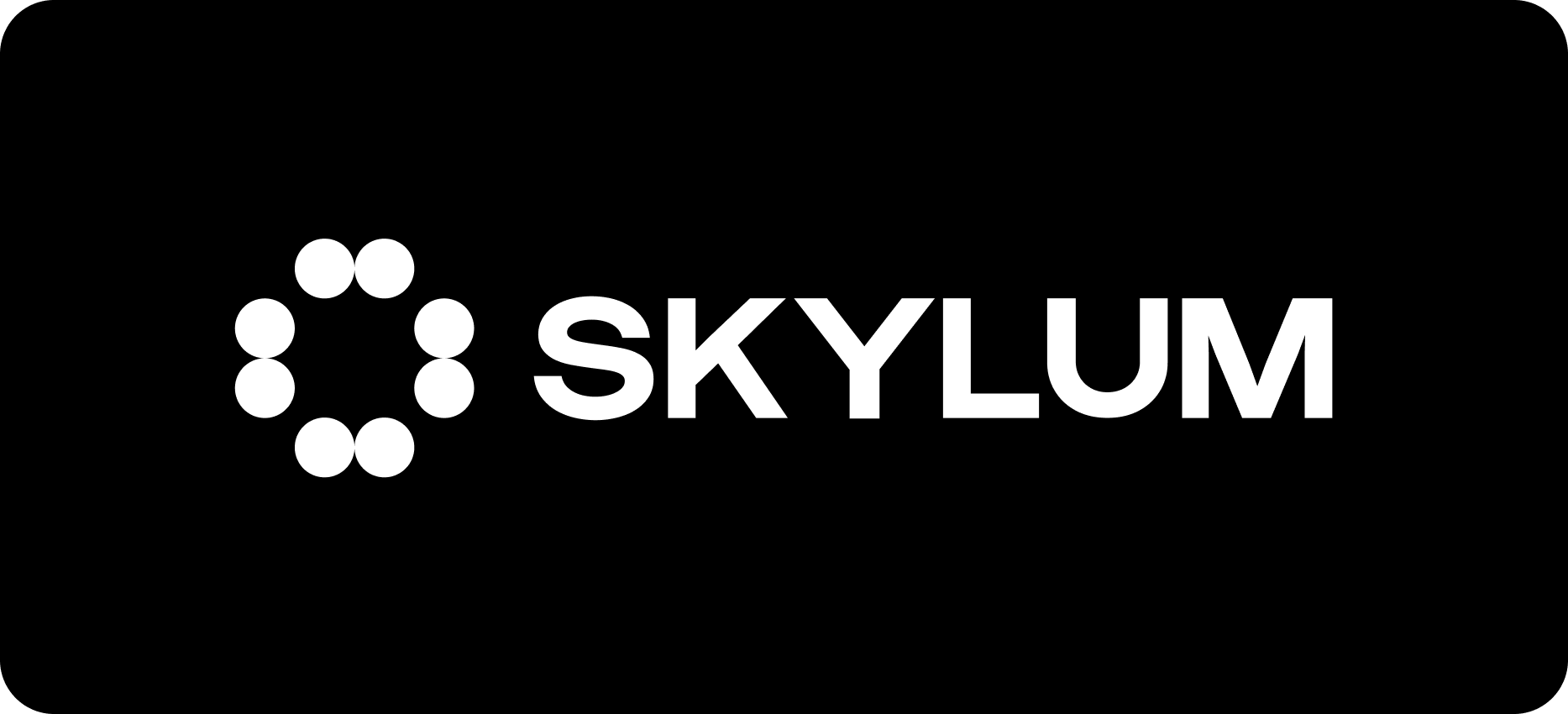
- Formerly: Macphun
- Industry: Software development
- Genre: Photo editing
- Founded: 2008, Ukraine
- Headquarters: New York City, USA
- Key people: Dmitry Sytnik (Co-founder) Paul Muzok (Co-founder) Ivan Kutanin (CEO)
- Number of employees: 120
- Website: skylum.com

Skylum (formerly Macphun) is a software development company based in Kyiv, Ukraine. It is most known for its award-winning photo editing software Luminar Neo and Aurora HDR. Skylum is also the developer of other photography apps for Mac such as Snapheal, Focus, Tonality, Intensify, Noiseless, and FX Photo Studio.

== History ==
Skylum was founded as Macphun in 2008 by two gaming developers and amateur photographers, Dmitry Sytnik and Paul Muzok. Initially the company developed applications for iOS. One of its first applications was Vintage Video Maker, which was later named Vintagio. In 2009, Apple named Vintagio among Best iPhone apps of the year. In total, the company released over 60 applications in the first three years. However, it saw the greatest number of downloads in the photography applications. Skylum thus decided to develop the same photography applications for macOS.

In early 2010, Skylum launched its first macOS application, FX Photo Studio Pro, which was earlier available for iOS only. Several other applications were also developed for macOS, including Snapheal.

In 2013 the company launched Intensify, a fully featured photo editing software that was named among the year's Best Mac App Store apps. In 2014, Skylum launched Tonality, a black-and-white photo editor software, that won Apple's Editors' Choice of the Year.

In 2015, Skylum released a new image noise reduction application called Noiseless. In the same year, Skylum partnered with Trey Ratcliff to develop an HDR program. As a result of this collaboration, Aurora HDR, a High Dynamic Range editing and processing tool, was released in November 2015. A year later, Skylum developed Luminar, an all-in-one photo editing software focused on ease of use and intuitive interface.

In 2017, the company released Aurora HDR and Luminar for Windows — software that previously was available for macOS only. Both Luminar and Aurora HDR became the most known applications developed by the company as of today. At the same time, Macphun announced that it would officially change its name to Skylum.

Over the years, Skylum has grown into an international team of over 100 professionals.

Skylum has released multiple versions of Luminar since 2016, including Luminar 2018, Luminar 3, Luminar 4, and Luminar AI. These versions integrated an increasing number of tools powered by AI technology, as Luminar evolved and added functionality.

Luminar 3 brought the ability to edit multiple images at once with a new library panel, optimizing it for efficiency. Released at the end of 2019, Luminar 4 introduced new AI-powered tools: AI Sky Replacement, AI Structure, AI Skin Enhancer, and Portrait Enhancer. Luminar 4 was the first image editor completely based on artificial intelligence. With the introduction of Luminar AI in 2020, Skylum has moved further in the implementation of artificial intelligence, which has helped automate the process of photo editing without sacrificing the quality.

Luminar Neo, a more advanced and feature-rich modular version of Luminar, was released in early 2022, and included support for layers, AI masking, Extensions, and more. Luminar Neo combines the best of Luminar 4 and builds on the technology behind Luminar AI. With a modernized modular engine, Luminar Neo is meant to accelerate the development and release of new features in the future.

In late 2023 the Skylum team added generative AI features to Luminar Neo's arsenal, including GenErase, GenSwap and GenExpand. Generative AI is capable of generating realistic visuals using generative models that learn the patterns on existing photos.

The Skylum Team also hosts exclusive photo excursions around the world under the brand name Luminar Adventures. During these tours, expert photography guides teach the participants photography and editing. Excursions have already taken place in Iceland, with plans to add trips to Japan, Portugal and other scenic destinations like Antarctica in 2024 and forward.

== Products ==
Skylum's flagship product is Luminar Neo. Considered to be an application for both amateur and professional photographers, Luminar Neo has a variety of AI-powered features like Sky AI and Face AI designed to enhance photos of any genre, including landscapes, portraits, street photos, and more. It also has features that use generative AI technology. Additionally, the application has built-in Presets, which can be used to apply a set of fixed adjustments to images in a few clicks. A variety of additional Presets are also available for purchase in the Luminar Marketplace. The effects can be combined using layers and masks. Luminar Neo supports multiple file formats, including RAW files.

Apart from Luminar Neo, Skylum is most known for its photo editing software, Aurora HDR, launched in 2015. Other notable software developed by the company includes Snapheal, Focus, Tonality, Intensify, Noiseless, FX Photo Studio, and Photolemur.

== Awards ==
Skylum products have been recognized with a number of awards. In 2019, Skylum took home 4 gold awards at the Digital Camera Grand Prix. The company was honored for innovation in the photo editing sphere with its Luminar 4, Aurora HDR 2019, and Photolemur editing software. Skylum also received a technical award for its innovative approach. In 2017, Luminar — and in 2019, Luminar Flex — was named the Best Software Plugin in the Lucie Technical Awards. In the same year, Luminar was awarded the Best Imaging Software by TIPA. In 2018, Luminar was named an Editor's Pick by Outdoor Photographer.

Luminar Neo has won multiple top industry awards, such as the Red Dot Brands & Communication Design award in the User Interface category and the TIPA World Awards for Best Imaging Software in 2022 and 2023.

Forbes Advisor added Luminar Neo to their list of Best Photo Editing Software of 2023 reviewing the tool as: "Luminar Neo is a popular photo editing software, and for good reason. It uses AI-enabled editing tools to enhance images, such as adding rays of sunshine to a landscape image, to give an example. Its user-friendly interface (UI) allows even beginners to adapt to photo editing easily. Moreover, it has advanced features including tagging, lens correction, and editing RAW images."
