= Luminar =

Luminar may refer to:

- Luminar Leisure, a British company that operates bars and nightclubs, now Deltic Group
- Luminar (software), photo editing software
- Luminar Technologies, an American developer of vision technology for self driving cars
