= Trey Ratcliff =

American photographer, public speaker and writer

- Born: July 7, 1971 (age 55); Austin, Texas, US
- Education: Jesuit College Preparatory, Southern Methodist University
- Occupation: Photographer
- Notable work: Aurora HDR
- Website: www.stuckincustoms.com www.treyratcliff.com

Trey Ratcliff (born July 7, 1971) is an American photographer, public speaker and writer.

== Personal life and education ==
Born in Austin, Texas, on July 7, 1971, Trey Ratcliff is the son of Susan Ratcliff and Ray Ratcliff. He attended Jesuit College Preparatory in Texas before moving on to Southern Methodist University where he studied Computer Science. Ratcliff has three children with his ex-wife.

== Career ==
Since starting his daily photography blog in 2005 Trey has been a proponent of Creative Commons licensing for his images.

Although being able to see only from his left eye since birth, he became notable in HDR photography. In 2017, Ratcliff's photographs had been viewed more than 150 billion times via Google based channels.

He was the first person to have HDR photography displayed in the Smithsonian Museum following their 4th Annual Photo Contest. In 2018, his photography was again on display at the Smithsonian in their Renwick Gallery as part of the exhibition "No Spectators: The Art of Burning Man".

Ratcliff was involved in the development of Aurora HDR; a High Dynamic Range (HDR) editing and processing tool released in November, 2015. It was made through a collaboration with software developer Skylum (formerly Macphun).

Trey has gained over 16 million followers on his social media accounts.

J. J. Abrams, the Star Trek director called Ratcliff's photographs inspiring and real.
