= Luminance HDR =

High-dynamic-range imaging software

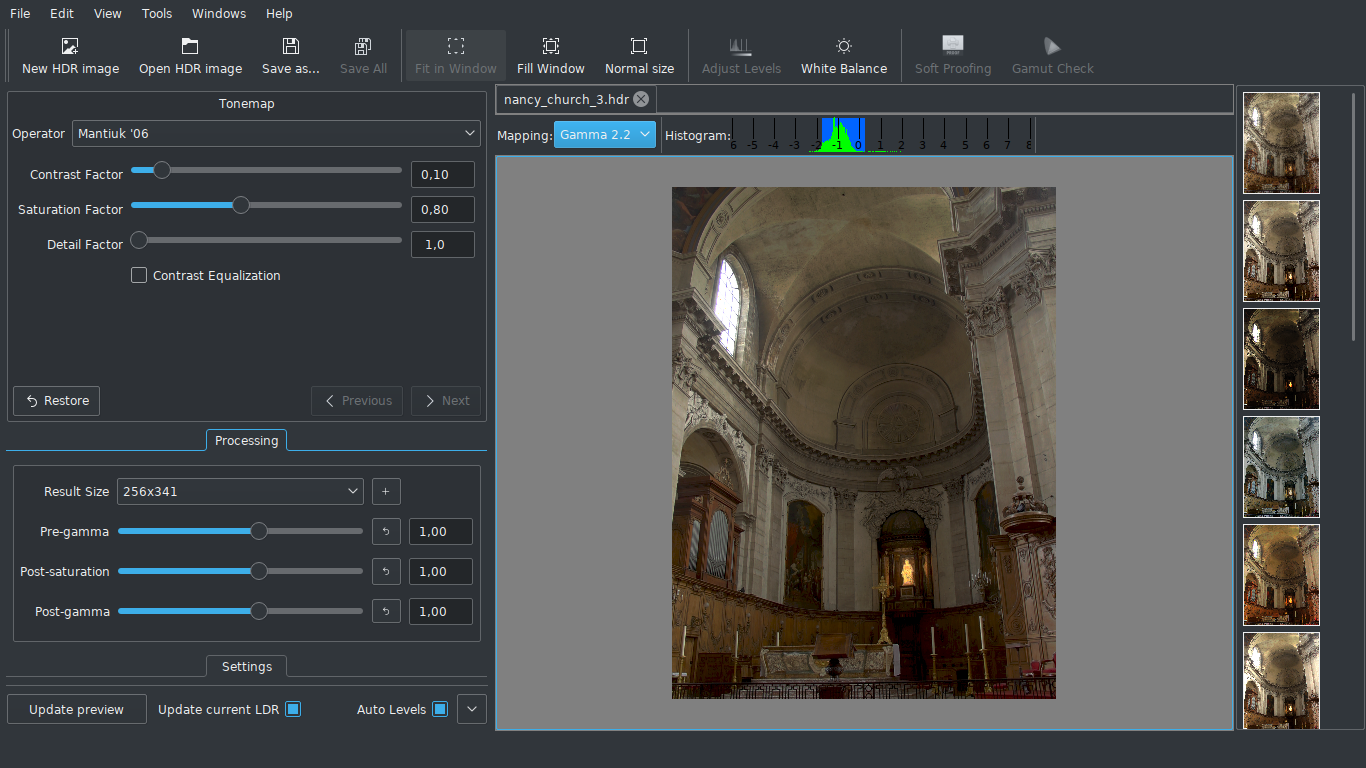
- Program for HDR workflow
- Original authors: Giuseppe Rota, Davide Anastasia, Franco Comida and others
- Stable release: 2.6.0 / June 9, 2019; 7 years ago
- Written in: C++
- Operating system: Windows, Linux, Mac OS X
- License: GPL v2
- Website: qtpfsgui.sourceforge.net
- Repository: github.com/LuminanceHDR/LuminanceHDR

Luminance HDR, formerly Qtpfsgui, is graphics software used for the creation and manipulation of high-dynamic-range images. Released under the terms of the GPL, it is available for Linux, Microsoft Windows, and Mac OS X (Intel only). Luminance HDR supports several High Dynamic Range (HDR) as well as Low Dynamic Range (LDR) file formats.

== Functionality ==
Prerequisite of HDR photography by multi-exposure HDR capture are several narrow-range digital images with different exposures. Luminance HDR combines these images and calculates a high-contrast image. In order to view this image on a regular computer monitor, Luminance HDR can convert it into a displayable LDR image format using a variety of methods, such as tone mapping. Currently fifteen different tone mapping operators (algorithms) are available, each one with its tunable parameters.

Different image processing techniques can be applied to the generated HDR images, such as resizing, cropping, rotating and a number of projective transformations.

The software also provides batch processing functionality for creating HDR images and for tone mapping them in a non-interactive way. A module for copying Exif data among sets of images is also provided.

For users who prefers the command line, a non-GUI, non-graphical interface is also available on all supported platforms.

A common problem with HDR photography is that images need to be aligned exactly. If the subject is static, this can be achieved using a tripod or a stable surface on which the camera is placed. In the case of image data that does not align exactly, an automatic alignment can be performed using a tool provided by the Hugin project. If this automation doesn't provide the desired result, the user may improve it manually.

== Supported formats ==
HDR images are images with a high dynamic range and, using Luminance HDR, they can be created as well as edited. The following HDR graphic formats are supported:

- OpenEXR
- Radiance HDR
- Tag Image File Format (TIFF) Format: 16 Bit, 32 Bit (Float) and LogLuv
- Raw
- PFS native

Luminance HDR can create an HDR image from several LDR images and tonemap an HDR into an LDR. The following LDR formats are supported:

- JPG
- PNG
- Portable Pixmap (PPM)
- Portable Bitmap (PBM)
- TIFF (8 Bit)
