= Luminar Neo =

Photo editing app

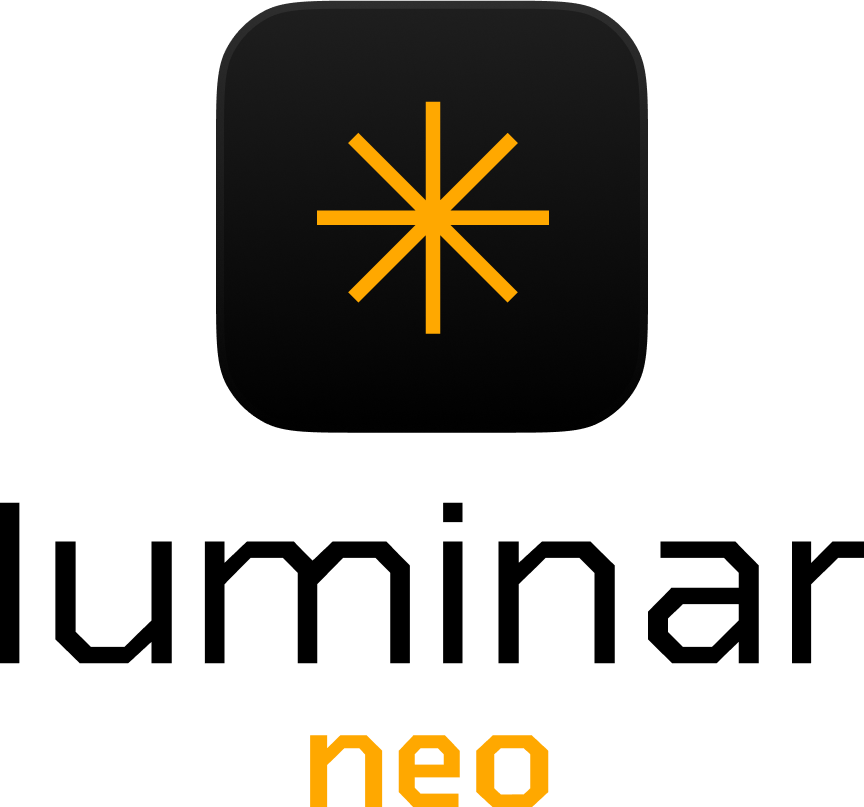
- Developer: Skylum
- Release: February 2022; 4 years ago
- Stable release: 1.20.0 (Jun 2024)
- Operating system: Windows, macOS
- Type: image editing, digital image processing
- License: Proprietary – Shareware
- Website: skylum.com/luminar

Luminar Neo is a photo editing software application developed by Skylum (formerly Macphun) available for Windows and macOS.

Luminar Neo was released in February 2022. It works as a standalone application and as a plugin for Adobe and Apple products.

== History ==
Prior to Luminar Neo, Skylum launched a series of image editing apps, including Luminar in November 2016 and Luminar Neptune in 2017. Initially developed only for macOS, Macphun launched Luminar 2018 for Windows in late 2017.

Luminar 2018, which was launched in November 2017, introduced a RAW develop module, changed the user interface, and added new filters.

Luminar Neo is the last-generation photo editing app developed by Skylum, released in February 2022.

The company website states that “What differentiates Luminar Neo from all previous versions of Luminar is its modular engine. Modules help to evenly distribute the load for faster image processing. This allows you to apply lots of different tools to an image without significant performance losses and save all edits automatically.”

== General info ==
Luminar Neo is considered to be a tool for both amateur and professional photographers. It has a modular engine, which evenly distributes the load for faster image processing. This allows photographers to apply lots of different edits to an image without significant performance losses and save all edits automatically and non-destructively.

Luminar Neo has a variety of AI-powered features like Sky AI and Face AI designed to enhance photos of any genre, including landscapes, portraits, street photos, and others. Additionally, the application has built-in Presets, which can be used to apply a set of fixed adjustments to images in a few clicks. A variety of additional Presets are also available for purchase in the Luminar Marketplace. The effects can be combined using layers and masks. Luminar Neo supports multiple file formats, including raw files.

== Reception ==
Luminar Neo has won multiple top industry awards, such as the Red Dot Brands & Communication Design award in the User Interface category and the TIPA World Awards for Best Imaging Software in 2022 and in 2023.

Forbes Advisor added Luminar Neo to their list of Best Photo Editing Software of 2023 reviewing the tool as: “Luminar Neo is a popular photo editing software, and for good reason. It uses AI-enabled editing tools to enhance images, such as adding rays of sunshine to a landscape image, to give an example. Its user-friendly interface (UI) allows even beginners to adapt to photo editing easily. Moreover, it has advanced features including tagging, lens correction and editing RAW images.”

PC Magazine advised to choose Luminar Neo for “Clean interface, filters, and unique fixes.”

TechRadar described Luminar Neo as “Powerful, very easy to use, and a great place to start for photographers who fear the complexity of Lightroom or Photoshop.”
