= Aurora HDR =

Photographic software developed by Skylum

- Developer: Macphun LLC
- Stable release: 2017
- Operating system: Mac OS X Windows
- Type: Photo Post-Production
- License: Proprietary
- Website: Aurora HDR

Aurora HDR is a photographic software developed by Skylum Software (formerly Macphun) for both Mac OS X and Windows. Aurora HDR is designed to be a multi-functional and user-friendly post-production HDR photo editing software.

Aurora HDR is a high dynamic range (HDR) editing and processing tool released in November 2015. It was made through a collaboration between Skylum and HDR photographer Trey Ratcliff.

== Versions and plug-ins ==
Aurora HDR comes in five different versions for two different operating systems: Mac OS X and Windows. Versions, previous and current, include: Aurora HDR, Aurora HDR Pro, Aurora HDR Pro + training, Aurora 2017, and Aurora 2018. The software runs as a standalone or as a plug-in to host applications like Adobe Photoshop, Adobe Photoshop Lightroom, Adobe Photoshop Elements, and Apple Aperture. In early 2016, Aurora HDR was updated with support to run as an editing extension for Apple Photos for Mac. In 2016, Skylum released the next version of Aurora HDR - Aurora HDR 2017 along with a Windows version. In 2018, Skylum released Aurora 2018 for both Mac and Windows operating systems.

== Key Aurora HDR functionality ==
=== Initial merging ===
Aurora HDR works on single images or multiple exposures, and initial merging options change depending on the number of images loaded. These include the "Chromatic Aberration Reduction" option, "Alignment" and "Ghost Reduction".

=== Interface ===
The user interface of Aurora HDR consists of the following:

- Large preview window
- Open & Export/Share
- Zoom & navigation controls
- Comparison controls
- Undo/Redo
- Cropping tool
- Move (hand) tool
- Brush
- Layers
- Histogram
- Presets
- Advanced tools

=== Presets ===
Presets are pre-installed one-click controls that apply a specific "style" to the tone-mapped image. This style is created entirely by the use and modification of the Advance tools containing in the software. The Preset panel in Aurora HDR Pro contains 7 separate categories applicable to all types of photos and users can designate their favorite for future use.

=== Tools ===
Aurora HDR comes with an extensive list of tools and functionality designed to help photographers edit their images using HDR techniques. The tools range from those that can help reproduce a natural, realistic look to those that enhance images towards a more fantasy-like direction. Each tool listed below has a unique set of controls to modify its effects.

- Tone Mapping
- Tone
- Structure
- HDR Denoise
- Image Radiance
- Color
- Details
- Glow
- Top & Bottom Lighting
- Tone Curve
- Color Filter
- Color Toning
- Vignette

=== Layers, brushes and masking ===
Aurora HDR Pro features the ability to create up to 9 layers (4 in the Mac App Store version), and provides brushing and masking functionality common in many image-editing software programs. Layers can be automatically loaded with either (a) the previous layer, (b) a custom texture, (c) the original tone-mapped image, or (d) any one of the exposures in the bracketed set. Brushes and masking, including Gradient Masking are used to selectively apply or erase effects from the image. An advanced feature of the Pro version of Aurora HDR is to designate a layer as one that contains "Luminosity Masking."

=== Opening, file formats and exporting ===
Aurora HDR opens a variety of popular image file formats, including RAW camera files that are the native to specific camera manufacturers (e.g. Nikon's NEF and Canon CR2). It saves in a native file format (.mpau) which allows for the resumption of editing after saving and closing the file. The software exports in the following file formats: JPG, PNG, GIF, JPG-2000, TIFF, Photoshop, and PDF, and can also transfer images directly into Skylum's Creative Suite for further editing.

=== Sharing ===
The software permits sharing to image galleries like 500px, Smugmug and Flickr, plus social networks like Facebook and Twitter. Additionally Aurora HDR can send images via email or Apple Messages.
