= Dynamic Photo HDR =

Photography software

- Developer: Mediachance
- Stable release: 4.65
- Operating system: Microsoft Windows
- Type: Photo Post-Production
- License: Proprietary
- Website: Dynamic Photo HDR

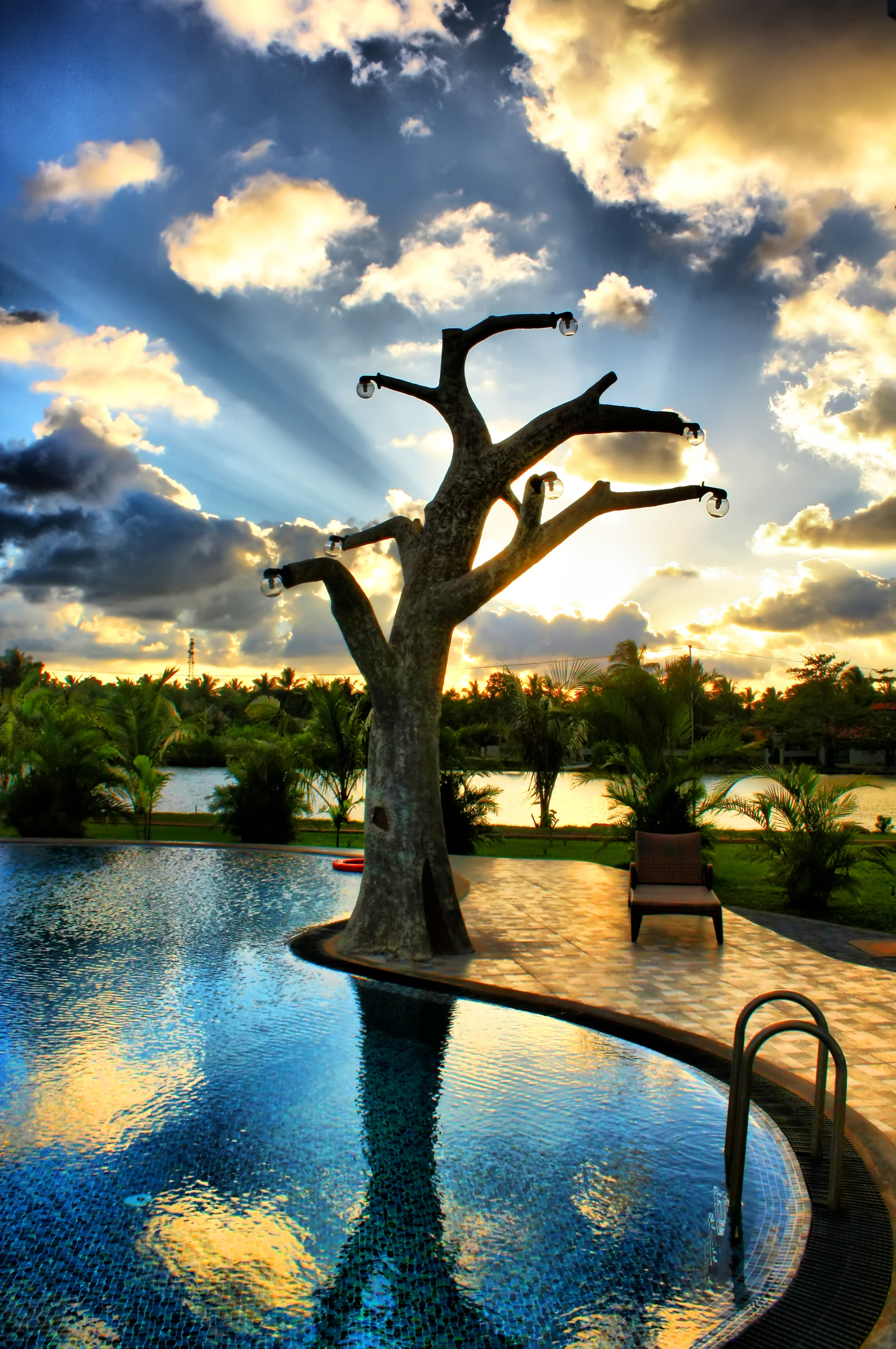
Single image file tone mapped using Dynamic Photo HDR

Dynamic Photo HDR is a photography software developed by Mediachance for Microsoft Windows, designed to create and tone map high dynamic range photos by combining multiple JPG or RAW camera images taken using multiple exposures. It uses automatic and manual Pin Warping method to align images. There is also a Mac version that runs under virtualization. A trial version of the software is available from the official website.
