= Charles Wyckoff =

American photographer

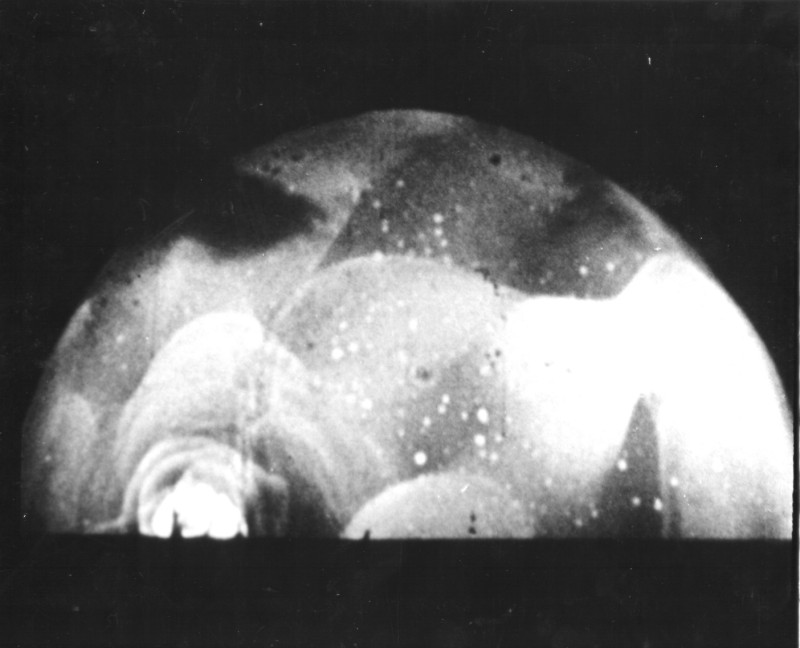
Wyckoff's famous image of "Ivy Mike", the first hydrogen bomb detonation, appeared on the cover of Life magazine on April 19, 1954.

Charles Wales Wyckoff (1916 – May 9, 1998) was an American photographic innovator, a photochemist specializing in high speed photography, also noted today for his innovations in the field of high dynamic range imaging and Extended_reality..

Born in Cleveland, Ohio, he was a graduate of Dartmouth College. He later did postgraduate work at the Massachusetts Institute of Technology with Harold Edgerton, graduating from MIT in 1941. After World War II he worked with Edgerton to develop techniques to photograph atomic experiments in the Pacific Ocean. With little resources in the field, he solved chronic fogging problems during tests in the Marshall Islands in 1954, thus saving the entire photographic record of the project. He was later engaged by CBS to analyze the famous Zapruder film of the Kennedy assassination. In 1975, with Edgerton and Robert Rines he made headlines by allegedly photographing the Loch Ness monster.

He was a Life Fellow of the Society of Motion Picture and Television Engineers. In 1967, he was made a Fellow of the Society for Imaging Science and Technology.
