= Oloneo PhotoEngine =

Digital image editing software

PhotoEngine
- Developer: Oloneo SAS
- Stable release: 1.1.400.438
- Operating system: Microsoft Windows
- Platform: IA-32 and x86-64
- Website: oloneo.com

Oloneo PhotoEngine is a popular digital image editing software application developed by Paris-based Oloneo SAS. The application produces high-dynamic-range images and tone mapped images by programmatically combining standard-dynamic range images of different exposures. PhotoEngine supports 96-bit per pixel HDR image files in RAW and TIFF formats.

The software, developed by Oloneo's president Antoine Clappier, was first beta released in July 2010.
