= HIO =

HIO may refer to:

- Hillsboro Airport, in Washington County, Oregon, United States
- Hypoiodous acid, an oxidising agent
- Hybrid input-output algorithm, in coherent diffraction imaging
- Oslo University College, the largest state university college in Norway
- Østfold University College, a further and higher education institution in south-eastern Norway
- Tsoa language, spoken in Botswana and Zimbabwe
