= Hybrid input-output algorithm =

Algorithm for phase retrieval

The hybrid input-output (HIO) algorithm for phase retrieval is a modification of the error reduction algorithm for retrieving the phases in coherent diffraction imaging. Determining the phases of a diffraction pattern is crucial since the diffraction pattern of an object is its Fourier transform and in order to properly invert transform the diffraction pattern the phases must be known. Only the amplitude however, can be measured from the intensity of the diffraction pattern and can thus be known experimentally. This fact together with some kind of support constraint can be used in order to iteratively calculate the phases. The HIO algorithm uses negative feedback in Fourier space in order to progressively force the solution to conform to the Fourier domain constraints (support). Unlike the error reduction algorithm which alternately applies Fourier and object constraints the HIO "skips" the object domain step and replaces it with negative feedback acting upon the previous solution.

Although it has been shown that the method of error reduction converges to a limit (but usually not to the correct or optimal solution) there is no limit to how long this process can take. Moreover, the error reduction algorithm will almost certainly find a local minimum instead of the global solution. The HIO differs from error reduction only in one step but this is enough to reduce this problem significantly. Whereas the error reduction approach iteratively improves solutions over time the HIO remodels the previous solution in Fourier space applying negative feedback. By minimizing the mean square error in Fourier space from the previous solution, the HIO provides a better candidate solution for inverse transforming. Although it is both faster and more powerful than error reduction, the HIO algorithm does have a uniqueness problem. Depending on how strong the negative feedback is there can often be more than one solution for any set of diffraction data. Although a problem, it has been shown that many of these possible solutions stem from the fact that HIO allows for mirror images taken in any plane to arise as solutions. In crystallography, the scientist is seldom interested in the atomic coordinates relative to any other reference than the molecule itself and is therefore more than happy with a solution that is upside-down of flipped from the actual image. A downside is that HIO has a tendency to escape both global and local maxima. This problem also depends on the strength of the feedback parameter, and a good solution to this problem is to switch algorithm when the error reaches its minimum. Other methods of phasing a coherent diffraction pattern include difference map algorithm and "relaxed averaged alternating reflections" or RAAR.

== See also ==
- Phase retrieval
- Gerchberg-Saxton algorithm
