= Point spread function =

Response of an optical system to a point source of light

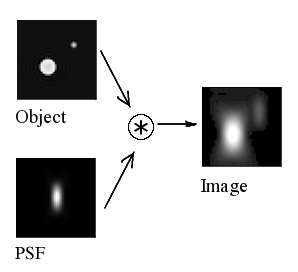
Image formation in a confocal microscope: central longitudinal (XZ) slice. The 3D acquired distribution arises from the convolution of the real light sources with the PSF.

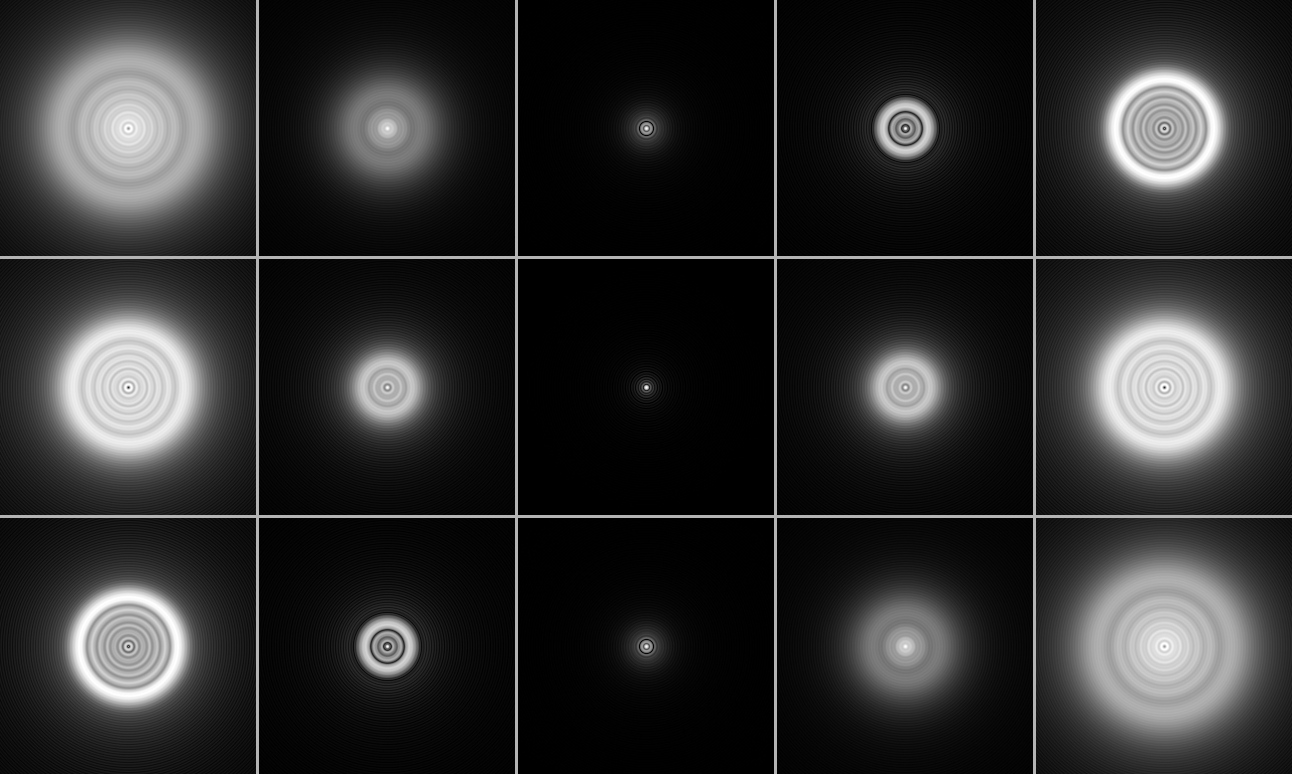
A point source as imaged by a system with negative (top), zero (center), and positive (bottom) spherical aberration. Images to the left are defocused toward the inside, images on the right toward the outside.

The point spread function (PSF) describes the response of a focused optical imaging system to an idealized point source of light. In casual terms, for a given camera, it is the blurry blob image captured from pointing that camera at a single speck of light.

More technically, a PSF is a form of impulse response function (IRF) for a focused optical imaging system, in spatial terms (as opposed to temporal terms). In functional terms, it is the spatial domain version (i.e., the inverse Fourier transform) of the optical transfer function (OTF) of an imaging system. It is a useful concept in Fourier optics, astronomical imaging, medical imaging, electron microscopy and other imaging techniques such as 3D microscopy (like in confocal laser scanning microscopy) and fluorescence microscopy.

The degree of spreading (blurring) in the image of a point object for an imaging system is a measure of the quality of the imaging system. In non-coherent imaging systems, such as fluorescent microscopes, telescopes or optical microscopes, the image formation process is linear in the image intensity and described by a linear system theory. This means that when two objects A and B are imaged simultaneously by a non-coherent imaging system, the resulting image is equal to the sum of the independently imaged objects. In other words: the imaging of A is unaffected by the imaging of B and vice versa, owing to the non-interacting property of photons. In space-invariant systems, i.e. those in which the PSF is the same everywhere in the imaging space, the image of a complex object is then the convolution of that object and the PSF. The PSF can be derived from diffraction integrals.

== Introduction ==
By virtue of the linearity property of optical non-coherent imaging systems, i.e.,

Image(Object_{1} + Object_{2}) = Image(Object_{1}) + Image(Object_{2})

the image of an object in a microscope or telescope as a non-coherent imaging system can be computed by expressing the object-plane field as a weighted sum of 2D impulse functions, and then expressing the image plane field as a weighted sum of the images of these impulse functions. This is known as the superposition principle, valid for linear systems. The images of the individual object-plane impulse functions are called point spread functions (PSF), reflecting the fact that a mathematical point of light in the object plane is spread out to form a finite area in the image plane. In some branches of mathematics and physics, these might be referred to as Green's functions or impulse response functions. PSFs are considered impulse response functions for imaging systems.

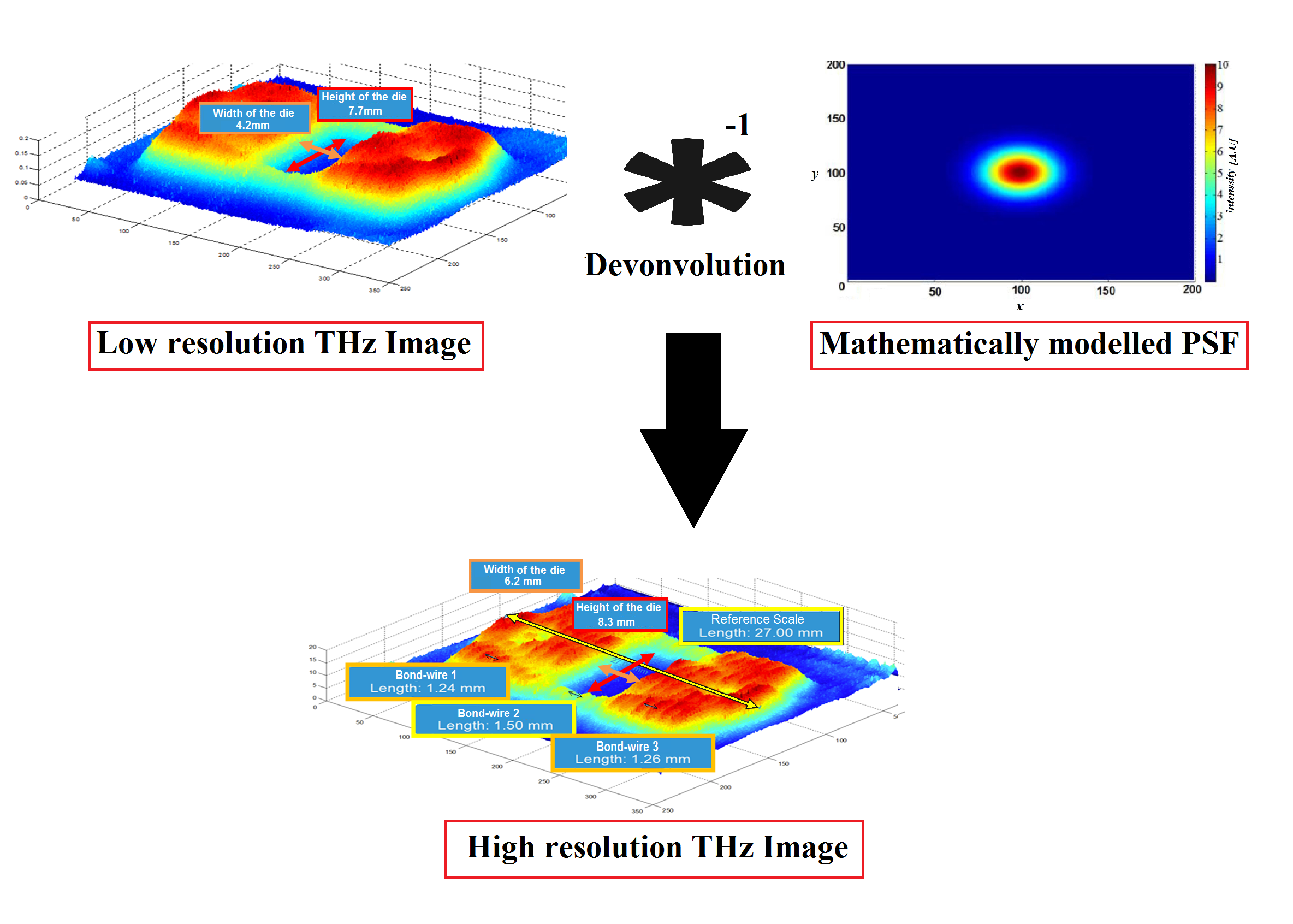
Application of PSF: Deconvolution of the mathematically modeled PSF and the low-resolution image enhances the resolution.

When the object is divided into discrete point objects of varying intensity, the image is computed as a sum of the PSF of each point. As the PSF is typically determined entirely by the imaging system (that is, microscope or telescope), the entire image can be described by knowing the optical properties of the system. This imaging process is usually formulated by a convolution equation. In microscope image processing and astronomy, knowing the PSF of the measuring device is very important for restoring the (original) object with deconvolution. For the case of laser beams, the PSF can be mathematically modeled using the concepts of Gaussian beams. For instance, deconvolution of the mathematically modeled PSF and the image, improves visibility of features and removes imaging noise.

== Theory ==
The point spread function may be independent of position in the object plane, in which case it is called shift invariant. In addition, if there is no distortion in the system, the image plane coordinates are linearly related to the object plane coordinates via the magnification M as:

$$(x_i, y_i) = (M x_o, M y_o)$$.

If the imaging system produces an inverted image, we may simply regard the image plane coordinate axes as being reversed from the object plane axes. With these two assumptions, i.e., that the PSF is shift-invariant and that there is no distortion, calculating the image plane convolution integral is a straightforward process.

Mathematically, we may represent the object plane field as:

$$O(x_o,y_o) = \iint O(u,v) ~ \delta(x_o-u,y_o-v) ~ du\, dv$$

i.e., as a sum over weighted impulse functions, although this is also really just stating the sifting property of 2D delta functions (discussed further below). Rewriting the object transmittance function in the form above allows us to calculate the image plane field as the superposition of the images of each of the individual impulse functions, i.e., as a superposition over weighted point spread functions in the image plane using the same weighting function as in the object plane, i.e., $O(x_o,y_o)$. Mathematically, the image is expressed as:

$$I(x_i,y_i) = \iint O(u,v) ~ \mathrm{PSF}(x_i/M-u, y_i/M-v) \, du\, dv$$

in which $\mbox{PSF}(x_i/M-u,y_i/M-v)$ is the image of the impulse function $\delta(x_o-u,y_o-v)$.

The 2D impulse function may be regarded as the limit (as side dimension w tends to zero) of the "square post" function, shown in the figure below.

Square Post Function

We imagine the object plane as being decomposed into square areas such as this, with each having its own associated square post function. If the height, h, of the post is maintained at 1/w^{2}, then as the side dimension w tends to zero, the height, h, tends to infinity in such a way that the volume (integral) remains constant at 1. This gives the 2D impulse the sifting property (which is implied in the equation above), which says that when the 2D impulse function, δ(x − u,y − v), is integrated against any other continuous function, f(u,v), it "sifts out" the value of f at the location of the impulse, i.e., at the point (x,y).

The concept of a perfect point source object is central to the idea of PSF. However, there is no such thing in nature as a perfect mathematical point source radiator; the concept is completely non-physical and is rather a mathematical construct used to model and understand optical imaging systems. The utility of the point source concept comes from the fact that a point source in the 2D object plane can only radiate a perfect uniform-amplitude, spherical wave — a wave having perfectly spherical, outward travelling phase fronts with uniform intensity everywhere on the spheres (see Huygens–Fresnel principle). Such a source of uniform spherical waves is shown in the figure below. We also note that a perfect point source radiator will not only radiate a uniform spectrum of propagating plane waves, but a uniform spectrum of exponentially decaying (evanescent) waves as well, and it is these which are responsible for resolution finer than one wavelength (see Fourier optics). This follows from the following Fourier transform expression for a 2D impulse function,

$$\delta (x,y) \propto  \iint e^{j(k_x x + k_y y)} \, d k_x\, d k_y$$

Truncation of Spherical Wave by Lens

The quadratic lens intercepts a portion of this spherical wave, and refocuses it onto a blurred point in the image plane. For a single lens, an on-axis point source in the object plane produces an Airy disc PSF in the image plane. It can be shown (see Fourier optics, Huygens–Fresnel principle, Fraunhofer diffraction) that the field radiated by a planar object (or, by reciprocity, the field converging onto a planar image) is related to its corresponding source (or image) plane distribution via a Fourier transform (FT) relation. In addition, a uniform function over a circular area (in one FT domain) corresponds to J_{1}(x)/x in the other FT domain, where J_{1}(x) is the first-order Bessel function of the first kind. That is, a uniformly-illuminated circular aperture that passes a converging uniform spherical wave yields an Airy disk image at the focal plane. A graph of a sample Airy disk is shown in the adjoining figure.

Airy disk

Therefore, the converging (partial) spherical wave shown in the figure above produces an Airy disc in the image plane. The argument of the function J_{1}(x)/x is important, because this determines the scaling of the Airy disc (in other words, how big the disc is in the image plane). If Θ_{max} is the maximum angle that the converging waves make with the lens axis, r is radial distance in the image plane, and wavenumber k = 2π/λ where λ = wavelength, then the argument of the function is: kr tan(Θ_{max}). If Θ_{max} is small (only a small portion of the converging spherical wave is available to form the image), then radial distance, r, has to be very large before the total argument of the function moves away from the central spot. In other words, if Θ_{max} is small, the Airy disc is large (which is just another statement of Heisenberg's uncertainty principle for Fourier Transform pairs, namely that small extent in one domain corresponds to wide extent in the other domain, and the two are related via the space-bandwidth product). By virtue of this, high magnification systems, which typically have small values of Θ_{max} (by the Abbe sine condition), can have more blur in the image, owing to the broader PSF. The size of the PSF is proportional to the magnification, so that the blur is no worse in a relative sense, but it is definitely worse in an absolute sense.

The figure above illustrates the truncation of the incident spherical wave by the lens. In order to measure the point spread function — or impulse response function — of the lens, a perfect point source that radiates a perfect spherical wave in all directions of space is not needed. This is because the lens has only a finite (angular) bandwidth, or finite intercept angle. Therefore, any angular bandwidth contained in the source, which extends past the edge angle of the lens (i.e., lies outside the bandwidth of the system), is essentially wasted source bandwidth because the lens can't intercept it in order to process it. As a result, a perfect point source is not required in order to measure a perfect point spread function. All we need is a light source which has at least as much angular bandwidth as the lens being tested (and of course, is uniform over that angular sector). In other words, we only require a point source which is produced by a convergent (uniform) spherical wave whose half angle is greater than the edge angle of the lens.

Due to intrinsic limited resolution of the imaging systems, measured PSFs are not free of uncertainty. In imaging, it is desired to suppress the side-lobes of the imaging beam by apodization techniques. In the case of transmission imaging systems with Gaussian beam distribution, the PSF is modeled by the following equation:

$$\begin{align}
\mathrm{PSF}(f, z) &= I_r(0,z,f)\exp\left[-z\alpha(f)-\dfrac{2\rho^2}{0.36{\frac{cka}{\text{NA}f}}\sqrt{1+g(f,z)}}\right], \\[1ex]
g(f,z) &= \left[\frac{2\ln 2}{c\pi}\left ( \frac{\text{NA}}{0.56k} \right )^2 fz\right ]^2
\end{align}$$

where k-factor depends on the truncation ratio and level of the irradiance, NA is numerical aperture, c is the speed of light, f is the photon frequency of the imaging beam, I_{r} is the intensity of reference beam, a is an adjustment factor and $\rho$ is the radial position from the center of the beam on the corresponding z-plane.

== History and methods ==
The diffraction theory of point spread functions was first studied by Airy in the nineteenth century. He developed an expression for the point spread function amplitude and intensity of a perfect instrument, free of aberrations (the so-called Airy disc). The theory of aberrated point spread functions close to the optimum focal plane was studied by Zernike and Nijboer in the 1930–40s. A central role in their analysis is played by Zernike's circle polynomials that allow an efficient representation of the aberrations of any optical system with rotational symmetry. Recent analytic results have made it possible to extend Nijboer and Zernike's approach for point spread function evaluation to a large volume around the optimum focal point. This extended Nijboer-Zernike (ENZ) theory allows studying the imperfect imaging of three-dimensional objects in confocal microscopy or astronomy under non-ideal imaging conditions. The ENZ-theory has also been applied to the characterization of optical instruments with respect to their aberration by measuring the through-focus intensity distribution and solving an appropriate inverse problem.

== Applications ==
=== Microscopy ===
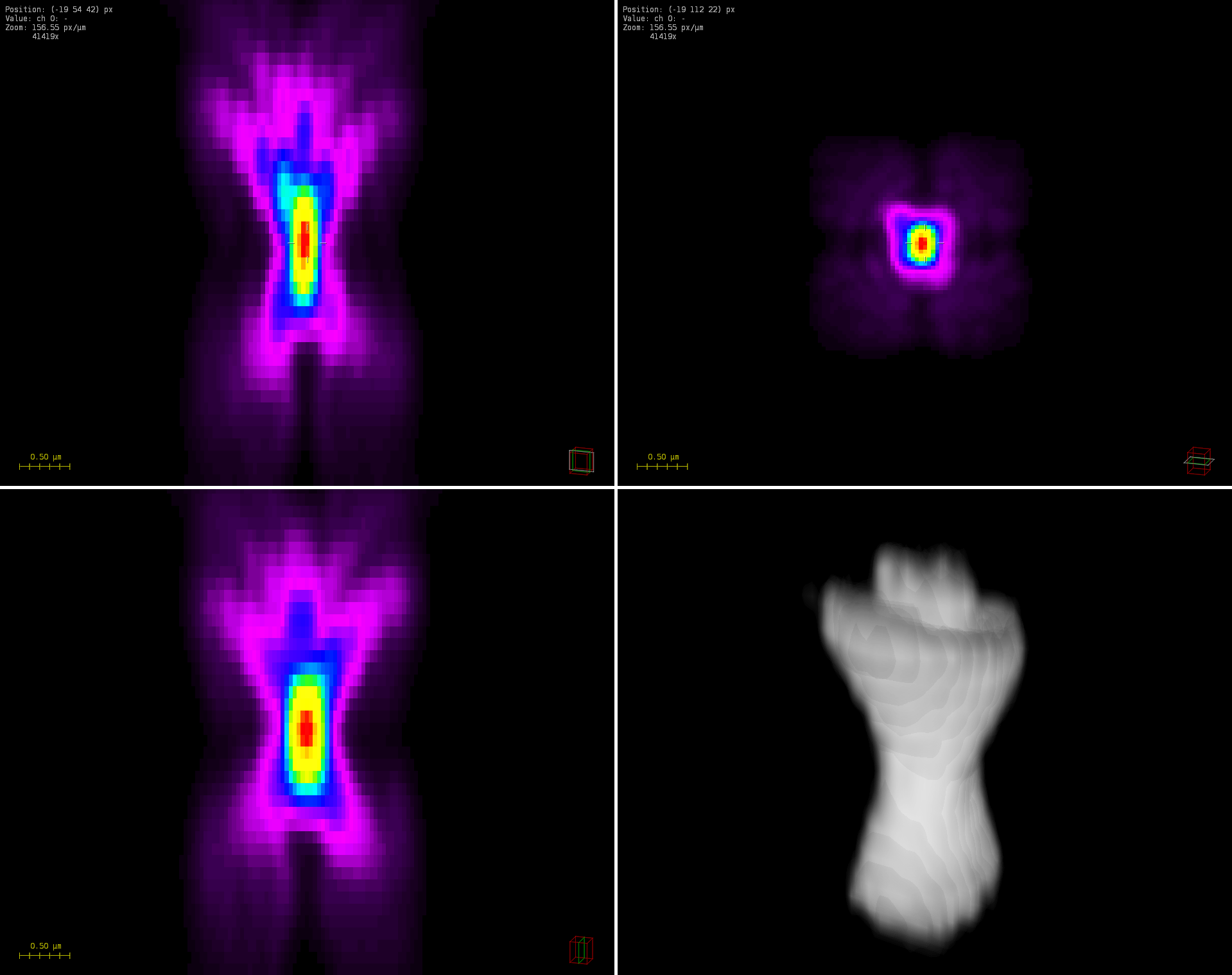
An example of an experimentally derived point spread function from a confocal microscope using a 63x 1.4NA oil objective. It was generated using Huygens Professional deconvolution software. Shown are views in xz, xy, yz and a 3D representation.

In microscopy, experimental determination of PSF requires sub-resolution (point-like) radiating sources. Quantum dots and fluorescent beads are usually considered for this purpose. Theoretical models as described above, on the other hand, allow the detailed calculation of the PSF for various imaging conditions. The most compact diffraction limited shape of the PSF is usually preferred. However, by using appropriate optical elements (e.g., a spatial light modulator) the shape of the PSF can be engineered towards different applications.

=== Astronomy ===
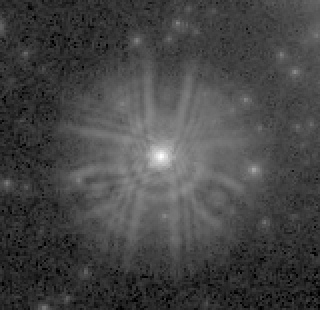
The point spread function of Hubble Space Telescope's WFPC camera before corrections were applied to its optical system.

In observational astronomy, the experimental determination of a PSF is often very straightforward due to the ample supply of point sources (stars or quasars). The form and source of the PSF may vary widely depending on the instrument and the context in which it is used.

In exoplanet detection, models of stellar background PSFs are generated from Gaia data that is then combined with TESS light curves to create TESS-Gaia Light Curves (TGLCs). These TGLCs decontaminate data from target stars by subtracting the simulated PSFs from observed data, eliminating pixel blending and leaving only light from the host star. This technique has been adopted by MIT and integrated directly into the TESS data pipeline for its effectiveness with fainter targets.

For radio telescopes and diffraction-limited space telescopes, the dominant terms in the PSF may be inferred from the configuration of the aperture in the Fourier domain. In practice, there may be multiple terms contributed by the various components in a complex optical system. A complete description of the PSF will also include diffusion of light (or photo-electrons) in the detector, as well as tracking errors in the spacecraft or telescope.

For ground-based optical telescopes, atmospheric turbulence (known as astronomical seeing) dominates the contribution to the PSF. In high-resolution ground-based imaging, the PSF is often found to vary with position in the image (an effect called anisoplanatism). In ground-based adaptive optics systems, the PSF is a combination of the aperture of the system with residual uncorrected atmospheric terms.

=== Lithography ===
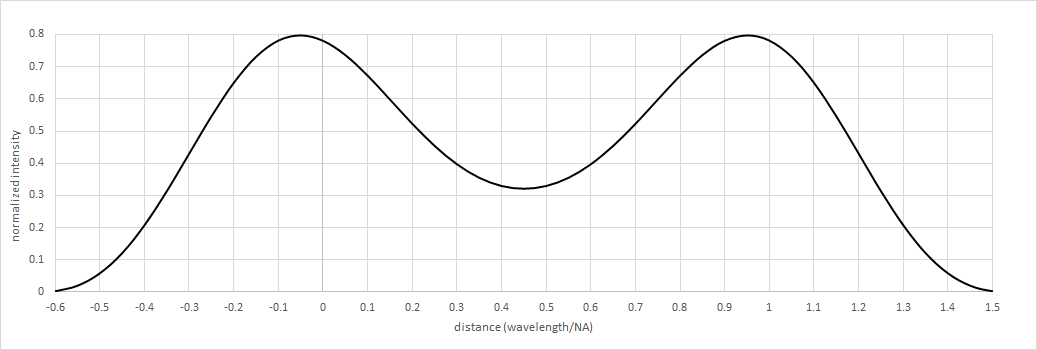
Overlapped PSF peaks. When the peaks are as close as ~ 1 wavelength/NA, they are effectively merged. The FWHM is ~ 0.6 wavelength/NA at this point.

The PSF is also a fundamental limit to the conventional focused imaging of a hole, with the minimum printed size being in the range of 0.6-0.7 wavelength/NA, with NA being the numerical aperture of the imaging system. For example, in the case of an EUV system with wavelength of 13.5 nm and NA=0.33, the minimum individual hole size that can be imaged is in the range of 25-29 nm. A phase-shift mask has 180-degree phase edges which allow finer resolution.

=== Ophthalmology ===
Point spread functions have recently become a useful diagnostic tool in clinical ophthalmology. Patients are measured with a Shack-Hartmann wavefront sensor, and special software calculates the PSF for that patient's eye. This method allows a physician to simulate potential treatments on a patient, and estimate how those treatments would alter the patient's PSF. Additionally, once measured the PSF can be minimized using an adaptive optics system. This, in conjunction with a CCD camera and an adaptive optics system, can be used to visualize anatomical structures not otherwise visible in vivo, such as cone photoreceptors.

== See also ==
- Airy disc
- Circle of confusion, for the closely related topic in general photography.
- Deconvolution
- Encircled energy
- Impulse response function
- Microscope
- Microsphere
- PSF Lab
