= Encircled energy =

In optics, encircled energy is a measure of concentration of energy in an image, or projected laser at a given range. For example, if a single star is brought to its sharpest focus by a lens giving the smallest image possible with that given lens (called a point spread function or PSF), calculation of the encircled energy of the resulting image gives the distribution of energy in that PSF.

Encircled energy is calculated by first determining the total energy of the PSF over the full image plane, then determining the centroid of the PSF. Circles of increasing radius are then created at that centroid and the PSF energy within each circle is calculated and divided by the total energy. As the circle increases in radius, more of the PSF energy is enclosed, until the circle is sufficiently large to completely contain all the PSF energy. The encircled energy curve thus ranges from zero to one.

A typical criterion for encircled energy (EE) is the radius of the PSF at which either 50% or 80% of the energy is encircled. This is a linear dimension, typically in micrometers. When divided by the lens or mirror focal length, this gives the angular size of the PSF, typically expressed in arc-seconds when specifying astronomical optical system performance.

Encircled energy is also used to quantify the spreading of a laser beam at a given distance. All laser beams spread due to the necessarily limited aperture of the optical system projecting the beam. As in star image PSF's, the linear spreading of the beam expressed as encircled energy is divided by the projection distance to give the angular spreading.

An alternative to encircled energy is ensquared energy, typically used when quantifying image sharpness for digital imaging cameras using pixels.

== See also ==
- Point spread function
- Airy disc
