= Optical correlator =

An optical correlator is an optical computer for comparing two signals by utilising the Fourier transforming properties of a lens. It is commonly used in optics for target tracking and identification.

== Introduction ==
The correlator has an input signal which is multiplied by some filter in the Fourier domain. An example filter is the matched filter which uses the cross correlation of the two signals.

The cross correlation or correlation plane, $c(x,y)$ of a 2D signal $i(x,y)$ with $h(x,y)$ is

$$c(x,y)=i(x,y) \otimes h^{*}(-x,-y)$$

This can be re-expressed in Fourier space as

$$C(\xi,\eta)=I(\xi,\eta) H^{*}(-\xi,-\eta)$$

where the capital letters denote the Fourier transform of what the lower case letter denotes. So the correlation can then be calculated by inverse Fourier transforming the result.

== Implementation ==
According to Fresnel Diffraction theory a convex lens of focal length $f$ will produce the exact Fourier transform at a distance $f$ behind the lens of an object placed $f$ distance in front of the lens. So that complex amplitudes are multiplied, the light source must be coherent and is typically from a laser. The input signal and filter are commonly written onto a spatial light modulator (SLM).

A typical arrangement is the 4f correlator. The input signal is written to an SLM which is illuminated with a laser. This is Fourier transformed with a lens and this is then modulated with a second SLM containing the filter. The resultant is again Fourier transformed with a second lens and the correlation result is captured on a camera.

== Filter design ==
Many filters have been designed to be used with an optical correlator. Some have been proposed to address hardware limitations, others were developed to optimize a merit function or to be invariant under a certain transformation.

=== Matched filter ===
The matched filter maximizes the signal-to-noise ratio and is simply obtained by using as a filter the Fourier transform of the reference signal $r(x,y)$.

$$H(\xi,\eta) = R(\xi,\eta)$$

=== Phase-only filter ===
The phase-only filter is easier to implement due to limitation of many SLMs and has been shown to be more discriminant than the matched filter.

$$H(\xi,\eta) = \frac{R(\xi,\eta)}{ \left\vert R(\xi,\eta)  \right\vert}$$
