= Gerchberg–Saxton algorithm =

Algorithm for phase retrieval

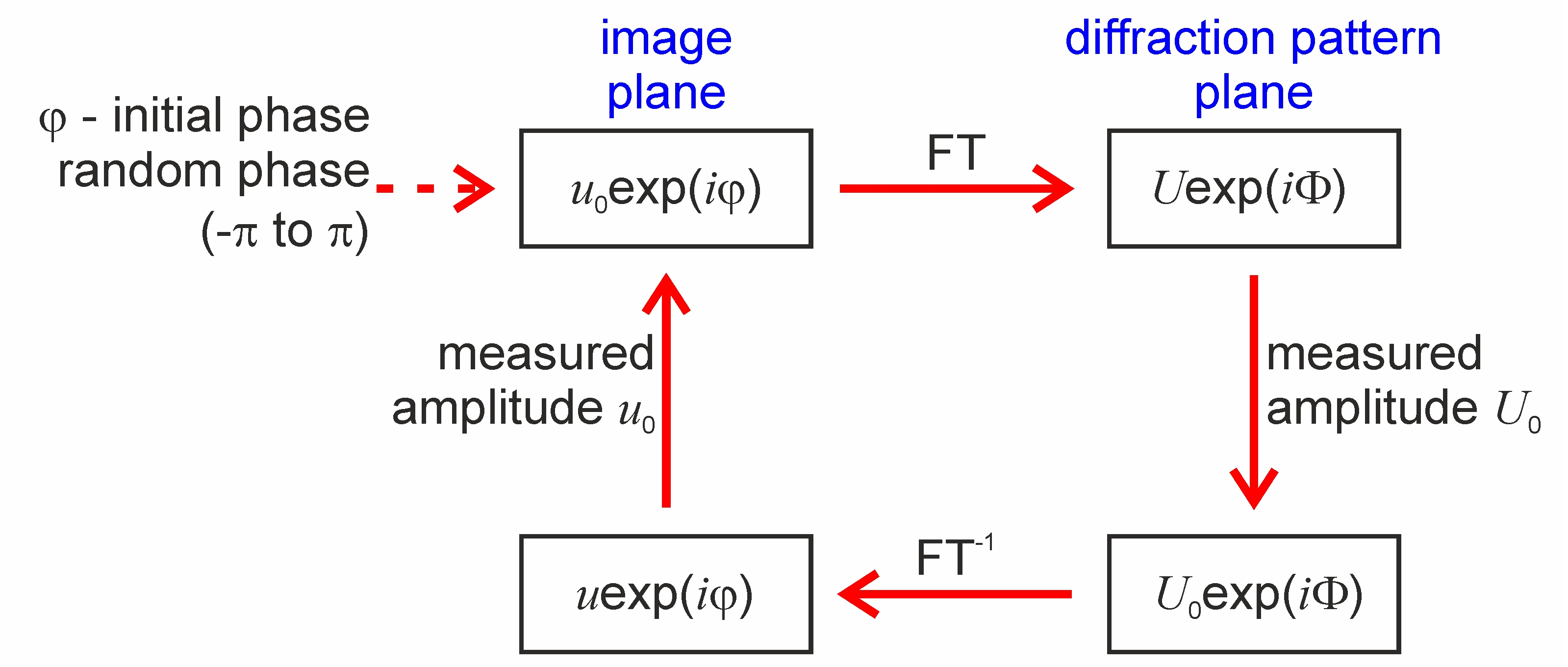
The Gerchberg–Saxton algorithm. FT is Fourier transform.

The Gerchberg–Saxton (GS) algorithm is an iterative phase retrieval algorithm for retrieving the phase of a complex-valued wavefront from two intensity measurements acquired in two different planes. Typically, the two planes are the image plane and the far field (diffraction) plane, and the wavefront propagation between these two planes is given by the Fourier transform. The original paper by Gerchberg and Saxton considered image and diffraction pattern of a sample acquired in an electron microscope.

It is often necessary to know only the phase distribution from one of the planes, since the phase distribution on the other plane can be obtained by performing a Fourier transform on the plane whose phase is known. Although often used for two-dimensional signals, the GS algorithm is also valid for one-dimensional signals.

The pseudocode below performs the GS algorithm to obtain a phase distribution for the plane "Source", such that its Fourier transform would have the amplitude distribution of the plane "Target".

The Gerchberg-Saxton algorithm is one of the most prevalent methods used to create computer-generated holograms.

== Pseudocode algorithm ==
Let:
 FT – forward Fourier transform
 IFT – inverse Fourier transform
 i – the imaginary unit, √−1 (square root of −1)
 exp – exponential function (exp(x) = ex)
 Target and Source be the Target and Source Amplitude planes respectively
 A, B, C & D be complex planes with the same dimension as Target and Source
 Amplitude – Amplitude-extracting function:
   e.g. for complex z = x + iy, amplitude(z) = sqrt(x·x + y·y)
       for real x, amplitude(x) = |x|
 Phase – Phase extracting function:
   e.g. Phase(z) = arctan(y / x)
end Let

algorithm Gerchberg–Saxton(Source, Target, Retrieved_Phase) is
    A := IFT(Target)
    while error criterion is not satisfied
        B := Amplitude(Source) × exp(i × Phase(A))
        C := FT(B)
        D := Amplitude(Target) × exp(i × Phase(C))
        A := IFT(D)
    end while
    Retrieved_Phase = Phase(A)

This is just one of the many ways to implement the GS algorithm. Aside from optimizations, others may start by performing a forward Fourier transform to the source distribution.

== See also ==
- Phase retrieval
- Fourier optics
- Holography
- Adaptive-additive algorithm
