= Transport-of-intensity equation =

The transport-of-intensity equation (TIE) is a computational approach to reconstruct the phase of a complex wave in optical and electron microscopy. It describes the internal relationship between the intensity and phase distribution of a wave.

The TIE was first proposed in 1983 by Michael Reed Teague. Teague suggested to use the law of conservation of energy to write a differential equation for the transport of energy by an optical field. This equation, he stated, could be used as an approach to phase recovery.

Teague approximated the amplitude of the wave propagating nominally in the z-direction by a parabolic equation and then expressed it in terms of irradiance and phase:

$$\frac{2\pi}{\lambda} \frac{\partial}{\partial z}I(x,y,z)= -\nabla_{x,y} \cdot [I(x,y,z)\nabla_{x,y}\Phi],$$

where $\lambda$ is the wavelength, $I(x,y,z)$ is the irradiance at point $(x,y,z)$, and $\Phi$ is the phase of the wave. If the intensity distribution of the wave and its spatial derivative can be measured experimentally, the equation becomes a linear equation that can be solved to obtain the phase distribution $\Phi$.

For a phase sample with a constant intensity, the TIE simplifies to

$$\frac{d}{dz}I(z) = -\frac{\lambda}{2\pi} I(z) \nabla_{x,y}^2 \Phi.$$

It allows measuring the phase distribution of the sample by acquiring a defocused image, i.e. $I(x,y,z + \Delta z)$.

TIE-based approaches are applied in biomedical and technical applications, such as quantitative monitoring of cell growth in culture, investigation of cellular dynamics and characterization of optical elements. The TIE method is also applied for phase retrieval in transmission electron microscopy.
