= Space–bandwidth product =

Information-carrying capacity of an optical system

The space–bandwidth product (SBP) is a measure of the information-carrying capacity of an optical system. It is the product of the spatial extent (size) of the system and the bandwidth (frequency range) over which it operates.

== Holography ==
In holography, the space–bandwidth product determines the resolution and quality of the reconstructed holographic image. The SBP sets a limit on the amount of information that can be recorded and reconstructed.

In digital holography, the SBP of a holographic imaging system can be calculated by analyzing at the recorded interference pattern.

The SBP is directly related to the size of the hologram and the range of frequencies (or colors) that can be captured.

== Microscopy ==
The SBP of a modern microscope can reach up to tens of megapixels. However, image sensors that are used typically are only a few megapixels, so the majority of optical information in the system is undetected.
