= Window (disambiguation) =

A window is an opening in an otherwise solid, opaque surface, through which light can pass.

Window may also refer to:

== Aeronautics ==
- Launch window, in aerospace, a time period in which a particular rocket must be launched
- Chaff (radar countermeasure) (originally called Window), during World War II, the dropping of aluminium foil by aircraft to deceive radar installations

== Arts and entertainment ==
- Window, a 2005 film starring Louis Gossett Jr.
- "Window" (short story), a 1980 science-fiction short story by Bob Leman
- Window (album), a 1994 album by Christopher Cross
- Window, a 2000 EP by The Microphones
- "Window", a song by the Album Leaf from their 2004 album In a Safe Place
- "Window", a song by Fiona Apple from her 2005 album Extraordinary Machine
- "Window", a song by Foo Fighters from their 2026 album Your Favorite Toy
- "Window", a song by Genesis from their 1969 album From Genesis to Revelation
- "Window", a song by Still Woozy, 2020
- "Window", a song by Tyler, the Creator from his 2011 album Goblin
- "Window", a song by Carly Rae Jepsen from her 2020 album Dedicated Side B

== Computing ==
- Window (computing), a display rectangle used by a graphical user interface (GUI), or a text displayed at once among data of whole text
  - X Window System, the system used by most Unix-like operating systems and OpenVMS
- A window in computer networking, a data transmission period, see sliding window protocol
- Register window, a feature of some CPUs
- Microsoft Windows, a computer operating system

== People ==
- Window Snyder, former Mozilla Corporation security expert
- Muriel Window, (1892–1965), American actress, singer, vaudeville performer, businesswoman and Ziegfeld Girl

== Science and technology ==
=== Atmospherics ===
- Atmospheric window or Astronomical window, those parts of the electromagnetic spectrum that are not absorbed by the Earth's atmosphere
  - Radio window
  - Optical window
  - Infrared window

=== Biology ===
- Window period, in medicine, the time between first infection and detectability

=== Electronics ===
- Window function, in signal processing, a function that is zero-valued outside of some chosen interval

=== Optics ===
- Window (optics)

=== Other uses ===
- Window (geology) (or "fenster"), a hole in a thrust sheet through which the underlying rocks crop out
- Johari window, a technique to improve understanding of one's self and the perceptions of others
- Overton window, the range of political ideas the public will accept

== See also ==
- The Window (disambiguation)
- Windows (disambiguation)
- Windowing (disambiguation)
- Window of opportunity
- First window (disambiguation)
- Second window (disambiguation)
