= Atmospheric window =

Range of EM wavelengths that can pass through Earth's atmosphere

Τhe absorption bands of Earth's atmosphere (grey colour) delimit its atmospheric windows (middle panel) and the effect they have on both downgoing solar radiation and upgoing thermal radiation emitted near the surface is shown in the top panel. The individual absorption spectra of major greenhouse gases plus Rayleigh scattering are shown in the lower panel.

An atmospheric window is a region of the electromagnetic spectrum that can pass through the atmosphere of Earth. The optical, infrared and radio windows comprise the three main atmospheric windows. The windows provide direct channels for Earth's surface to receive electromagnetic energy from the Sun, and for thermal radiation from the surface to leave to space. Atmospheric windows are useful for astronomy, remote sensing, telecommunications and other science and technology applications.

In the study of the greenhouse effect, the term atmospheric window may be limited to mean the infrared window, which is the primary escape route for a fraction of the thermal radiation emitted near the surface. In other fields of science and technology, such as radio astronomy and remote sensing, the term is used as a hypernym, covering the whole electromagnetic spectrum as in the present article.

== Role in Earth's energy budget ==
Atmospheric windows, especially the optical and infrared, affect the distribution of energy flows and temperatures within Earth's energy balance. The windows are themselves dependent upon clouds, water vapor, trace greenhouse gases, and other components of the atmosphere.

Out of an average 340 watts per square meter (W/m^{2}) of solar irradiance at the top of the atmosphere, about 200 W/m^{2} reaches the surface via windows, mostly the optical and infrared. Also, out of about 340 W/m^{2} of reflected shortwave (105 W/m^{2}) plus outgoing longwave radiation (235 W/m^{2}), 80-100 W/m^{2} exits to space through the infrared window depending on cloudiness. About 40 W/m^{2} of this transmitted amount is emitted by the surface, while most of the remainder comes from lower regions of the atmosphere. In a complementary manner, the infrared window also transmits to the surface a portion of down-welling thermal radiation that is emitted within colder upper regions of the atmosphere.

The "window" concept is useful to provide qualitative insight into some important features of atmospheric radiation transport. Full characterization of the absorption, emission, and scattering coefficients of the atmospheric medium is needed in order to perform a rigorous quantitative analysis (typically done with atmospheric radiative transfer codes). Application of the Beer-Lambert Law may yield sufficient quantitative estimates for wavelengths where the atmosphere is optically thin. Window properties are mostly encoded within the absorption profile.

== Other applications ==
=== In astronomy ===
Up until the 1940s, astronomers used optical telescopes to observe distant astronomical objects whose radiation reached the earth through the optical window. After that time, the development of radio telescopes gave rise to the more successful field of radio astronomy that is based on the analysis of observations made through the radio window.

=== In telecommunications ===
Communications satellites greatly depend on the atmospheric windows for the transmission and reception of signals: the satellite-ground links are established at frequencies that fall within the spectral bandwidth of atmospheric windows. Shortwave radio does the opposite, using frequencies that produce skywaves rather than those that escape through the radio windows.

=== In remote sensing ===
Both active (signal emitted by satellite or aircraft, reflection detected by sensor) and passive (reflection of sunlight detected by the sensor) remote sensing techniques work with wavelength ranges contained in the atmospheric windows.

== See also ==
- Optical window
- Infrared window
- Radio window
- Water window, for soft x-rays
