= Kirkpatrick–Baez mirror =

A Kirkpatrick–Baez mirror, or simply KB mirror, focuses beams of X-rays by reflecting them at grazing incidence off a curved surface, usually coated with a layer of a heavy metal. It is named after Paul Kirkpatrick and Albert Baez, the inventors of the X-ray microscope.

Although X-rays can be focused by compound refractive lenses, these also reduce the intensity of the beam and are therefore undesirable. KB mirrors, on the other hand, can focus beams to small spot sizes with minimal loss of intensity. Typically they are used in pairs - one to focus horizontally and one for vertical focus. When the horizontal and vertical focuses coincide, the X-ray beam is focused to a point.

== See also ==
- X-ray microscope – First application of the KB mirror
- X-ray optics – General article about all kinds of X-ray optics
