= Soft X-ray microscopy =

An X-ray microscope uses electromagnetic radiation in the soft X-ray band to produce images of very small objects.

Unlike visible light, X-rays do not reflect or refract easily, and they are invisible to the human eye. Therefore, the basic process of an X-ray microscope is to expose film or use a charge-coupled device (CCD) detector to detect X-rays that pass through the specimen. It is a contrast imaging technology using the difference in absorption of soft X-ray in the water window region (wavelength region: 2.34–4.4 nm, photon energy region: 280 – 530 eV) by the carbon atom (main element composing the living cell) and the oxygen atom (main element for water).

== Development ==
Early X-ray microscopes by Paul Kirkpatrick and Albert Baez used grazing incidence reflective optics to focus the X-rays, which grazed X-rays off parabolic curved mirrors at a very high angle of incidence. An alternative method of focusing X-rays is to use a tiny fresnel zone plate of concentric gold or nickel rings on a silicon dioxide substrate. Sir Lawrence Bragg produced some of the first usable X-ray images with his apparatus in the late 1940s.

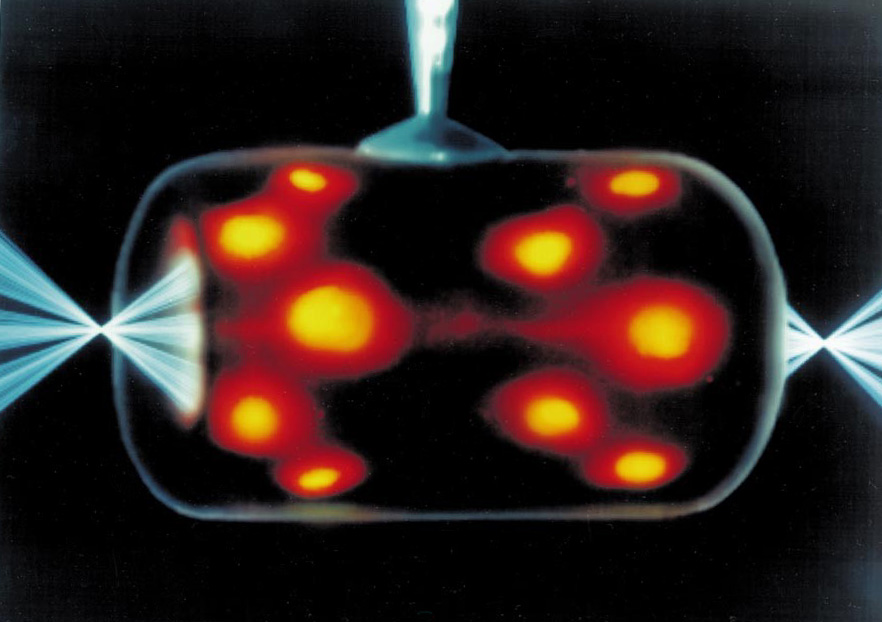
Indirect drive laser inertial confinement fusion uses a "hohlraum" which is irradiated with laser beam cones from either side on its inner surface to bathe a fusion microcapsule inside with smooth high intensity X-rays. The highest energy X-rays which penetrate the hohlraum can be visualized using an X-ray microscope such as here, where X-radiation is represented in orange/red.

In the 1950s Newberry produced a shadow X-ray microscope which placed the specimen between the source and a target plate, this became the basis for the first commercial X-ray microscopes from the General Electric Company.

== Notable soft X-ray microscopes ==
The Advanced Light Source (ALS) in Berkeley, California, is home to XM-1 (http://www.cxro.lbl.gov/BL612/), a full field soft X-ray microscope operated by the Center for X-ray Optics and dedicated to various applications in modern nanoscience, such as nanomagnetic materials, environmental and materials sciences and biology. XM-1 uses an X-ray lens to focus X-rays on a CCD, in a manner similar to an optical microscope. XM-1 held the world record in spatial resolution with Fresnel zone plates down to 15 nm and is able to combine high spatial resolution with a sub-100ps time resolution to study e.g. ultrafast spin dynamics. In July 2012, a group at DESY claimed a record spatial resolution of 10 nm, by using the hard X-ray scanning microscope at PETRA III.

The ALS is also home to the world's first soft X-ray microscope designed for biological and biomedical research. This new instrument, XM-2 was designed and built by scientists from the National Center for X-ray Tomography. XM-2 is capable of producing 3-Dimensional tomograms of cells.

== Characteristics and uses ==
Sources of soft X-rays suitable for microscopy, such as synchrotron radiation sources, have fairly low brightness of the required wavelengths, so an alternative method of image formation is scanning transmission soft X-ray microscopy. Here the X-rays are focused to a point and the sample is mechanically scanned through the produced focal spot. At each point the transmitted X-rays are recorded with a detector such as a proportional counter or an avalanche photodiode. This type of Scanning Transmission X-ray Microscope (STXM) was first developed by researchers at Stony Brook University and was employed at the National Synchrotron Light Source at Brookhaven National Laboratory.

The resolution of X-ray microscopy lies between that of the optical microscope and the electron microscope. It has an advantage over conventional electron microscopy in that it can view biological samples in their natural state. Electron microscopy is widely used to obtain images with nanometer level resolution but the relatively thick living cell cannot be observed as the sample has to be chemically fixed, dehydrated, embedded in resin, then sliced ultra thin. However, it should be mentioned that cryo-electron microscopy allows the observation of biological specimens in their hydrated natural state, albeit embedded in water ice. Until now, resolutions of 30 nanometer are possible using the Fresnel zone plate lens which forms the image using the soft X-rays emitted from a synchrotron. Recently, the use of soft X-rays emitted from laser-produced plasmas rather than synchrotron radiation is becoming more popular.

Additionally, X-rays cause fluorescence in most materials, and these emissions can be analyzed to determine the chemical elements of an imaged object. Another use is to generate diffraction patterns, a process used in X-ray crystallography. By analyzing the internal reflections of a diffraction pattern (usually with a computer program), the three-dimensional structure of a crystal can be determined down to the placement of individual atoms within its molecules. X-ray microscopes are sometimes used for these analyses because the samples are too small to be analyzed in any other way.

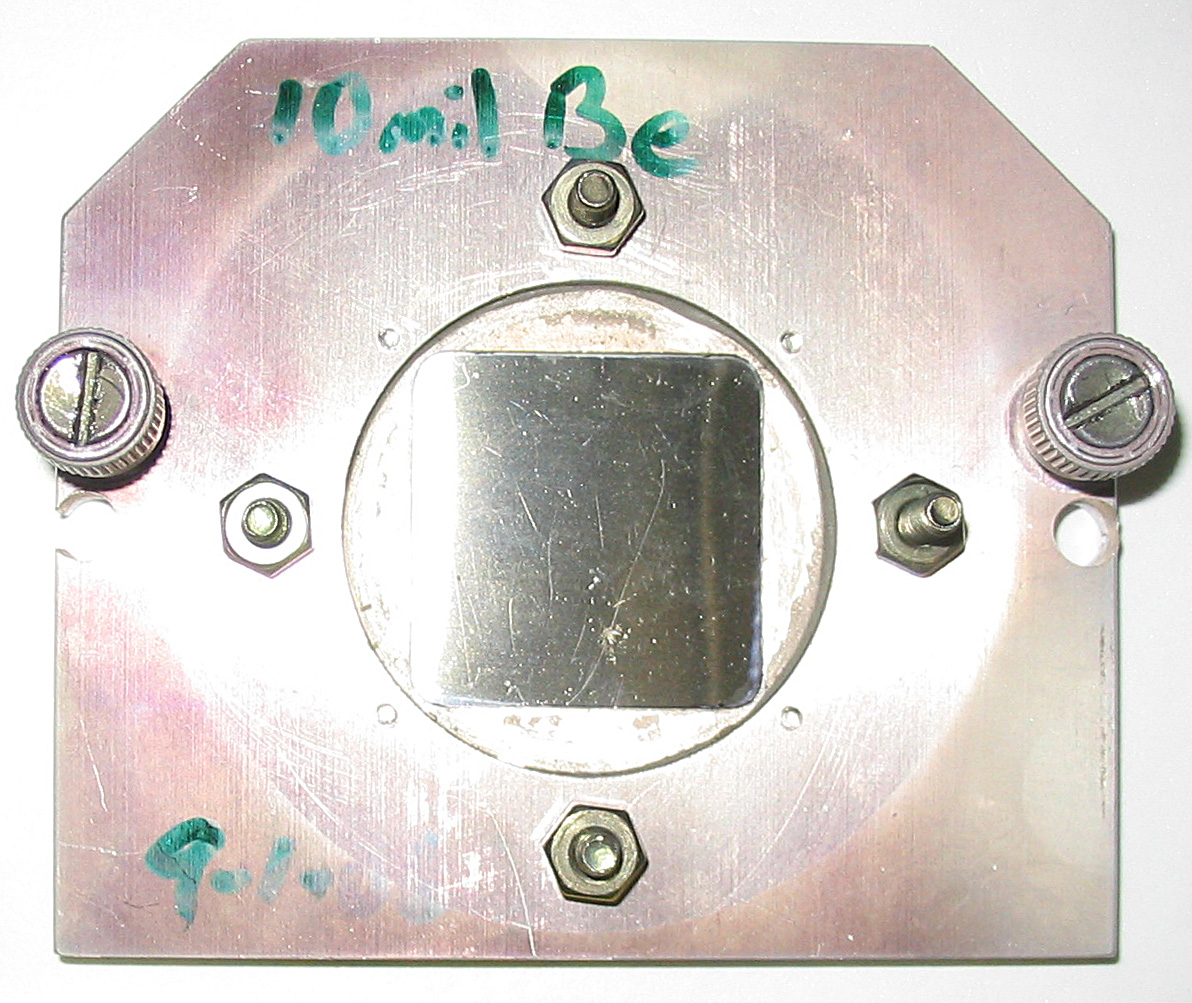
A square beryllium foil mounted in a steel case to be used as a window between a vacuum chamber and an X-ray microscope. Beryllium, due to its low Z number, is highly transparent to X-rays.

== See also ==
- Synchrotron X-ray tomographic microscopy
- X-ray microscope
- Electron microscope
