= Anne Sakdinawat =

Physicist

- Education: University of California, Berkeley
- Known for: X-ray optics
- Scientific career
- Workplaces: SLAC National Accelerator Laboratory; Lawrence Berkeley National Laboratory
- Thesis: Contrast and resolution enhancement techniques for soft x-ray microscopy (2008)
- Doctoral advisor: David Attwood

Anne Sakdinawat is an American physicist and a staff scientist at SLAC National Accelerator Laboratory, where her work focuses on the development of novel manufacturing techniques for nanoscale X-ray imaging. She is the co-author of a book on soft X-rays and extreme ultraviolet radiation.

== Education and career ==
Sakdinawat worked as a research scientist in the Electrical Engineering and Computer Sciences Department at the University of California, Berkeley. She received her PhD in Bioengineering in 2008 from the University of California, Berkeley, where she worked under the supervision of David Attwood. She joined SLAC National Accelerator Laboratory in 2012 and formed the NanoX group for X-ray optics. Her research focuses on using the brightest X-ray sources to develop advanced imaging techniques and tools.

== Awards and honors ==
- 2015 DOE Early Career Research Program
- 2008 Werner Meyer-Ilse Memorial Award
