= Xiaodong Zhang =

Xiaodong Zhang FRS
- Education: Peking University (BS); Stony Brook University (PhD)
- Awards: EMBO Member (2016)
- Scientific career
- Fields: Structural biology; Transcription; DNA repair; AAA proteins; ATPase
- Workplaces: Imperial College London; Harvard University; Francis Crick Institute
- Thesis: Development and applications of quantitative X-ray microscopy with chemical sensitivity (1995)
- Doctoral advisor: Janos Kirz; David Sayre
- Other academic advisors: Don Wiley
- Website: www.imperial.ac.uk/people/xiaodong.zhang

Xiaodong Zhang FRS is a Professor of Macromolecular Structure and Function at Imperial College London.

== Education ==
Zhang was educated at Peking University and Stony Brook University where she was awarded a PhD in 1995 on X-ray microscopy supervised by Janos Kirz and David Sayre.

== Research and career ==
After a postdoctoral research position at Harvard University with Don Wiley she moved to the Imperial Cancer Research Fund in 1997. She was appointed a lecturer at Imperial College London in 2001, a Reader in 2005 and a Professor in 2008.

Zhang's research investigates structural biology, transcription, DNA repair and AAA proteins, particularly ATPases.

=== Awards and honours ===
Zhang was awarded EMBO Membership in 2016 and elected a Fellow of the Royal Society (FRS) in 2024.
