= Günter Schmahl =

German physicist

- Born: March 26, 1936; Wilhelmshaven, Germany
- Died: August 14, 2018 (aged 82); Göttingen, Germany
- Known for: Soft X-ray microscopy
- Spouse: Helga Schmahl
- Scientific career
- Fields: Physics
- Workplaces: University of Göttingen

Günter Schmahl (26 March 1936 – 14 August 2018) was a German physicist, professor at the University of Göttingen and a pioneer of X-ray microscopy.

The main focus of Schmahl's work, and his most important achievement, was the development of full-field soft X-ray microscopy. He was one of the first to recognize the potential of this method and to identify and follow the technological approach of using zone plates as lenses in such a microscope. Schmahl and his collaborators further developed the technique until it was ready for application in two- and three-dimensional imaging of biological samples. (Note: DE 3642457, G. Schmahl, D. Rudolph, "Röntgen-Mikroskop", published 30 June 1988, assigned to Carl-Zeiss-Stiftung) (Note: US 4870674, G. Schmahl, D. Rudolph, "X-ray microscope", published 26 September 1989, assigned to Carl-Zeiss-Stiftung)

Schmahl founded the Institute for X-ray Physics at the University of Göttingen and headed it until his retirement in 2002. He was also one of the founders and the first organizer of the International Conference on X-Ray Microscopy, which has been held every three years since 1983 and biennially since 2008.

== Honors and awards ==
- 1985: Lower Saxony State Prize, category Science
- 1992: Röntgen Medal of the city of Remscheid
- 1995: Röntgen Award of the Department of Physics and Crystallography at the University of Würzburg
- Since 1996: Member of the Göttingen Academy of Sciences and Humanities
- 2005: Advanced Photon Source Compton Award, Argonne National Laboratory, Argonne, Illinois (together with Janos Kirz)
