= Second window =

Second window may refer to:

- broadcast syndication rights for a work following the expiration of first window rights for that work
- the inter-partes review period for third-party challenge and opposition of a granted patent or trademark
- a wavelength band or transmission window in fibre-optic communications
- the period of ischemic preconditioning, starting 24 hours after a coronary occlusion and lasting up to 72 hours, that can limit injuries of a subsequent ischaemia reperfusion in the myocardium

== See also ==
- Second Window, Second Floor, a song by Clyde McPhatter
- First window (disambiguation)
- Window (disambiguation)
- Windowing (disambiguation)
- Windows (disambiguation)
