= First window =

First window may refer to:

- first broadcast syndication rights for a work
- the post-grant review period for third-party challenge and opposition of a pending patent or trademark
- a wavelength band or transmission window in fibre-optic communications
- the initial 4-6 hour period of ischemic preconditioning, known as classical or early preconditioning, in which a coronary occlusion can limit injuries of a subsequent ischaemia reperfusion in the myocardium

== See also ==
- Second window (disambiguation)
- Window (disambiguation)
- Windowing (disambiguation)
- Windows (disambiguation)
