= International Conference on X-Ray Microscopy =

International Conference on X-Ray Microscopy (XRM)
- Genre: Physics Conference
- Location: changes every time
- Inaugurated: Göttingen 1983
- Most recent: Lund 2024
- Next event: Campinas 2026
- Attendance: 300-400
- Website: XRM2024

The International Conference on X-Ray Microscopy (XRM) is a biennial international conference on X-ray imaging. The scope includes a range of topics in X-ray imaging, both in the soft and hard X-ray spectrum. Imaging by synchrotron light sources is the dominant topic, but small scale laboratory imaging is also included in many talks and posters. A number of subtopics are covered, including but not limited to X-ray microtomography, Phase-contrast X-ray imaging, Ptychography, and X-ray optics. The conference is typically five days long and held in summer. The conference is organized by an international committee and a local host organization. This local host is in most cases a synchrotron facility or an institute closely connected to a synchrotron. The host of the conference is decided two conferences in advance with a majority vote by all conference attendees. For example, the 14th XRM (2018) was decided during the 12th XRM (2014).

== History ==
The initiators of XRM were the German physicist Günter Schmahl and the Hungarian-American physicist Janos Kirz. Schmahl hosted the first conference in Göttingen in 1983.

XRM was for several years triennial, but has been biennial since 2008.

The 2020 installment of XRM in Taiwan was postponed two years due to the COVID-19 pandemic.

== The Werner Meyer-Ilse Memorial Award ==
Werner Meyer-Ilse was the chair of the International Program Committee for XRM99, but died in a car accident days before the conference. In his memory XRM hands out the Werner Meyer-Ilse Memorial Award to "young scientists for exceptional contributions to the advancement of X-ray microscopy".

=== Previous Recipients ===
- 1999: Daniel Weiss and Jianwei Miao
- 2002: Michael Feser
- 2005: Weilun Chao
- 2008: Anne Sakdinawat and Pierre Thibault
- 2010: Christian Holzner
- 2012: Irene Zanette and Stephan Werner
- 2014: Kevin Mader
- 2016: Junjing Deng and Matias Kagias
- 2018: Claire Donnelly and Marie-Christine Zdora
- 2020: Jumpei Yamada (awarded 2022)
- 2022: Yanqi Luo and Jisoo Kim
- 2024: Takenori Shimamura and Yuhe Zhang

== List of XRM conference ==
#	year	name	city	country	attendance^{[a]}	proceedings	comment
1	1983	XRM I	Göttingen	Germany	50		First conference
2	1987	XRM II	Brookhaven, NY.	US			
3	1990	XRM III	London	UK			
4	1993	XRM IV	Chernogolovka	Russia			
5	1996	XRM V	Würzburg	Germany			
6	1999	XRM99	Berkeley, CA.	US			First WMIM award
7	2002	XRM2002	Grenoble	France	239		
8	2005	XRM2005	Himeji	Japan			First conference outside Europe and US
9	2008	XRM2008	Zürich	Switzerland	300		
10	2010	XRM2010	Chicago, Il.	US	344		
11	2012	XRM2012	Shanghai	China	295		
12	2014	XRM2014	Melbourne	Australia	336		
13	2016	XRM2016	Oxford	UK	380		
14	2018	XRM2018	Saskatoon	Canada			
15	2022	XRM2022	Hsinchu	Taiwan			Virtual, originally planned as XRM2020
16	2024	XRM2024	Lund	Sweden			Originally planned as XRM2022
17	2026	XRM2026	Campinas	Brazil			

== See also ==
- X-ray microscope
- Phase-contrast X-ray imaging
- Synchrotron
- Coherent diffractive imaging (CDI)
- Ptychography
- Günter Schmahl

== Notes ==
^{a} Attendance numbers are taken from their respective proceedings.
