= XRM =

XRM may refer to:

- International Conference on X-Ray Microscopy, a biennial physics conference
- X-ray microscope, a high-resolution imaging system using X-rays
- xRM, an evolution of the concept Customer Relationship Management (CRM)
