= Windows X =

Windows X may refer to:

- X Window System, a windowing system for bitmap displays, common on UNIX-like computers
  - An implementation of the X server for Microsoft Windows; see X.Org Server § Adoption
- Windows 10, a Microsoft operating system
  - Windows 10X, cancelled Microsoft operating system

== See also ==
- Windows key
- Windows XP
- Windows 9x
- List of Microsoft Windows versions
- Windows (disambiguation)
