= David Attwood =

David Attwood may refer to:

- David Attwood (film director) (1952–2024), English filmmaker
- David Attwood (physicist) (born 1941), American physicist and professor
- Dave Attwood (born 1987), English rugby union player
