= Regina Soufli =

American physicist

- Born: Athens, Greece
- Education: University of California, Berkeley
- Known for: x-ray optics
- Scientific career
- Workplaces: Lawrence Livermore National Laboratory; Lawrence Berkeley National Laboratory; Center for Astrophysics | Harvard & Smithsonian

Regina Soufli is a Greek-American physicist and a staff scientist at Lawrence Livermore National Laboratory, in Livermore, California, where she works on the development and the characterization of materials and thin-film coatings for extreme ultraviolet (EUV) and X-ray applications. The results of her work is the heart of the reflective optics used in EUV lithography, the next-generation in semiconductor manufacturing technology, in satellites such as NASA's Solar Dynamics Observatory and NASA/NOAA's GOES-16 to GOES-19, or on optics for Free-electron lasers such as the Linac Coherent Light Source at SLAC National Accelerator Laboratory.

== Career ==
Soufli earned her PhD from the University of California, Berkeley, studying the optical constants of materials in the EUV/Soft X-ray region for multilayer mirror applications under the supervision of David Attwood at Lawrence Berkeley National Laboratory, after initially completing an undergraduate degree at the National Technical University of Athens in Greece. After her PhD, she joined the Center for Astrophysics | Harvard & Smithsonian in 1997 to work on the optics of the Chandra X-ray Observatory. She then joined Lawrence Livermore National Laboratory in 1999 as a staff scientist.

Soufli is a fellow of the Optical Society of America and a senior member of the SPIE. In 2012, she received a NASA award as a member of the Solar Dynamics Observatory science investigation team.
