= David Attwood (physicist) =

American physicist

David T. Attwood
- Education: New York University
- Known for: X-ray optics, Coherent x-rays, EUV lithography
- Scientific career
- Workplaces: UC Berkeley; Lawrence Berkeley National Laboratory

David Attwood is an American physicist and professor emeritus at the University of California, Berkeley, where he worked in the field of synchrotron radiation and free-electron lasers, developing X-ray microscopy techniques for research and for the industry (EUV lithography). He is the author with Anne Sakdinawat of a reference book on X-rays and extreme ultraviolet radiation.

== Education and career ==
Dr. Attwood received his B.S. in Engineering Science in 1963 from Hofstra University and his Ph.D. in Applied Physics from New York University in 1972. After his Ph.D, he joined Lawrence Livermore National Laboratory to work on laser fusion. He was the first scientific director of the Advanced Light Source (1985–1988) and the founding director of the Center for X-Ray Optics at Lawrence Berkeley National Laboratory, where he was among early pioneers of EUV lithography. He co-founded the Applied Science and Technology (AS&T) program within the college of engineering at UC Berkeley and supervised over twenty grad students, among who Regina Soufli, Anne Sakdinawat, Yanwei Liu, Chang Chang, Brooke Lu Mesler, Andrew Aquila, Kristine Rosfjord, Raul Beguiristain, Max Wei, Khanh Nguyen, Brittany McClinton, Weilun Chao, Ryan Miyakawa and Christopher Anderson. He is a Fellow of the American Physical Society, Optica, and the Japanese Society of Applied Physics.
