= Microstructured optical arrays =

Microstructured optical arrays (MOAs) are instruments for focusing x-rays. MOAs use total external reflection at grazing incidence from an array of small channels to bring x-rays to a common focus. This method of focusing means that MOAs exhibit low absorption. MOAs are used in applications that require x-ray focal spots in the order of few micrometers or below, such as radiobiology of individual cells. Current MOA-based focusing optics designs have two consecutive array components in order to reduce comatic aberration.

== Properties ==
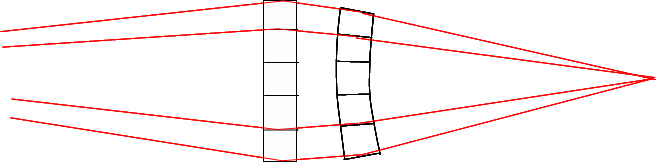
Fig. 1- MOA with second component compressed

MOAs are achromatic (which means the focal properties do not change for radiation of different wavelengths) as they utilize grazing incidence reflection. This means that they are able to focus chromatic radiation to a common point unlike zone plates. MOAs are also adjustable as the optic can be compressed to alter the focal properties such as focal length. Focal length can be calculated for the system in fig. 1 using the geometry shown in fig. 2 where it can be seen that changing the gap between the components (d+D in the figure) or the radius of curvature (R) will have a large effect on the focal length.

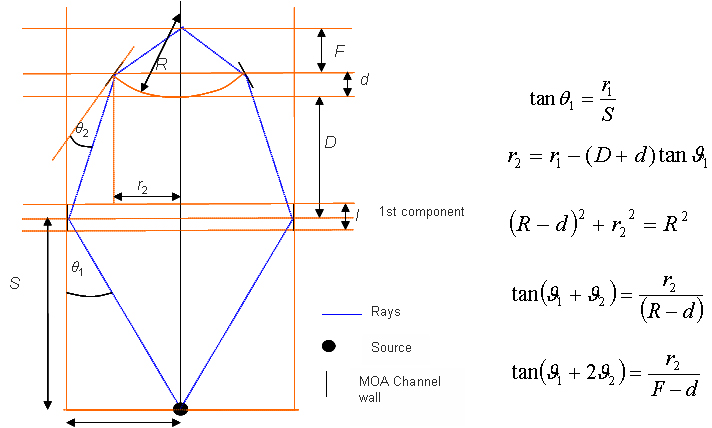
Fig. 2- Geometry of MOA in configuration shown in fig. 1

MOAs have been used in configurations shown in figs. 1 & 3 whereby one or both components can be adjusted. This has varying effects on the focal properties, in general it has been found that smaller focal spot sizes are apparent when MOAs are used as shown in fig. 1 with only the second component adjusted.

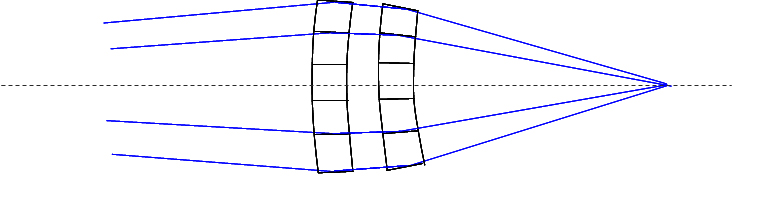
Fig. 3- MOA with both components compressed

The focal length of this system can be calculated using the geometry shown below:

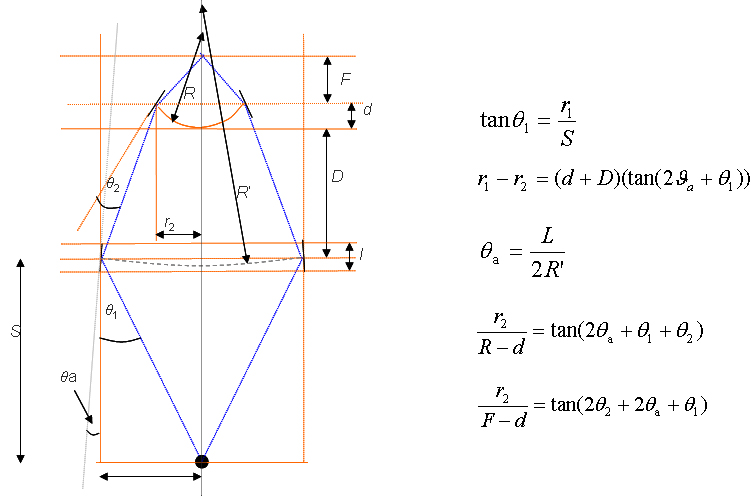
Fig. 4- Geometry of MOA in configuration shown in fig. 2

== Manufacturing ==
Current microstructured optical arrays are composed of silicon and created via the Bosch process, an example of Deep reactive ion etching and not to be confused with the Haber–Bosch process. In the Bosch process the channels are etched into the silicon using a plasma (plasma (physics)) in increments of a few micrometres. In between each etching the silicon is coated with a polymer in order to preserve the integrity of the channel walls.

== Applications ==
The focal spot size is important in x-ray microprobe instrumentation where x-rays are focused onto a biological sample to investigate phenomena such as the bystander effect.

To target a specific cell the focal spot size of the system must be around 10 micrometers, whereas to target specific areas of a cell such as the cytoplasm or the cell nucleus it should be no more than a few micrometers. Currently, only MOAs in the configuration shown in fig. 1 are thought to be able to achieve this.

MOAs provide a good alternative to zone plates in microprobe use due to the adjustable focal properties (making cell alignment easier) and ability to provide focusing of chromatic radiation to a single point. This is particularly useful when considering the finding that different effects can be observed using radiation of different wavelengths.
