= The Window =

"The Window" may refer to:

- The Window (song cycle), an 1871 song cycle by Arthur Sullivan and Alfred, Lord Tennyson
- The Window (1949 film), a 1949 American film
- The Window (1970 film), a 1970 Iranian film
- The Window (Steve Lacy album), a 1988 album by saxophonist Steve Lacy
- The Window (Ratboys album), a 2023 album by Ratboys
- "The Window" (How I Met Your Mother), a 2009 episode of the American sitcom How I Met Your Mother
- The Window (Cécile McLorin Salvant album), 2018
- "The Window", by The Flying Lizards from their self-titled album

== See also ==
- Window (disambiguation)
