= Water window =

The water window is a region of the electromagnetic spectrum in which water is transparent to soft x-rays. The window extends from the K-absorption edge of carbon at 282 eV (68 PHz, 4.40 nm wavelength) to the K-edge of oxygen at 533 eV (129 PHz, 2.33 nm wavelength). Water is transparent to these X-rays, but carbon and its organic compounds are absorbing. These wavelengths could be used in an x-ray microscope for viewing living specimens. This is technically challenging because few if any viable lens materials are available above extreme ultraviolet.

== See also ==
- electromagnetic absorption by water
- x-ray absorption spectroscopy
