= Compound refractive lens =

Type of X-ray lens

A compound refractive lens (CRL) is a series of individual lenses arranged in a linear array in order to achieve focusing of X-rays in the energy range of 5–40 keV. They are an alternative to the KB mirror.

For all materials the real part of the refractive index for X-rays is close to 1, hence a single conventional lens for X-rays has an extremely long focal length (for practical lens sizes). In addition, X-rays attenuate as they pass through a material so that conventional lenses for X-rays have long been considered impractical. The CRL gets its reasonably short focal length, on the order of meters, by using many lenses in series, hence reducing the curvatures of each lens to practical levels. Absorption in the lens is still a challenge, however, and lenses are usually made from low-atomic-number materials such as aluminium, beryllium, or lithium.

CRLs were first demonstrated in the mid-1990s by a group of scientists at the ESRF. They drilled holes in an aluminium block, and achieved focusing in two dimensions. For X-rays a concave lens focuses the X-rays because the index of refraction is slightly below unity. In a CRL of this type the walls between the cylindrical holes act as concave lenses for X-rays traveling perpendicular to the axis of the drilled cylinders. In contrast, for visible light the index of refraction is larger than unity and focusing is done with a convex lens.

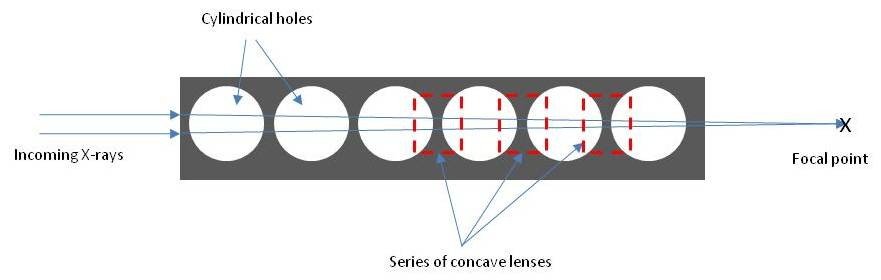

Scientists associated with the ESRF synchrotron have done much of the CRL's subsequent development, notably the parabolic CRLs pioneered by the Aachen group under Lengeler. Their signature material is beryllium: a group at the Advanced Photon Source demonstrated the same lenses in lithium. These lenses have a direct counterpart in visible light.

The saw-tooth lens is a unique optical scheme suggested and demonstrated by Cederstrom. It approximates a parabolic lens much as a numerical computation on a grid approximates a smooth line, with a series of prisms that each deflect the X-rays over a minute angle. Lenses of this type have been made from silicon, plastic, and lithium. To address the challenge with absorption in the lens, each prism in the saw-tooth lens can be exchanged for a column of smaller prisms, hence removing phase shifts of 2π that do not contribute to refraction but add absorption. This scheme is similar to the approximation of a conventional parabolic lens by a zone plate. The relatively simple manufacturing of the saw-tooth refractive lens and the prism-array lens make them usable also outside of research and both have been suggested for applications in medical x-ray imaging.
