= Sterling Newberry =

American inventor and microscopist

Sterling Price Newberry (August 10, 1915 – January 28, 2017) was an American inventor and microscopist. He was born in Springfield, Missouri. Newberry invented the shadow X-ray microscope and was one of the founders of the Microscopy Society of America. He turned 100 in August 2015 and died in January 2017 at the age of 101.

The first X-ray microscopes had used grazing off lenses at a very low angle to focus X-ray images. The images, however, were blurry from diffraction. While working on an alternate approach for General Electric, a technician came to him with a badge. The technician did not believe there were X-Rays in the machine, he had taken his warning badge, with X-ray film, and placed a bit of screen wire on it. He pulled the badge out and saw the exposed screen wire pattern on it. He also saw another screen wire pattern, however, far smaller and finer. Newberry recognized that the fine pattern was the screen wire mounting for the specimen, but it was 400-to-the-inch wire and it had been magnified by expansion of the shadow. This gave him the insight he needed to create a working commercial microscope, placing the specimen very close to a point source of X-rays and then further back a photographic plate. The "shadow" of the specimen would be under-exposed, that is X-ray dark, on the plate. This process is similar to medical X-rays, except that the microscope uses a point source for clarity whereas a medical x-ray tends to use a much larger x-ray source to avoid distortion.

Sterling also had a book of his poetry published in 2013. Titled A Way With Words, it was compiled by his transgender daughter Emily Pittman Newberry and published by One Spirit Press in Portland Oregon. In part, the introduction says, "This is a book of poetry by a true renaissance man, Sterling Price Newberry. Born in 1915 in Springfield Missouri, he grew up on the family farm in the town of Strafford, became a teenager just as the Great Depression hit, went to college in the depths of it, and served his country during World War II as a scientist in a munitions plant, making sure our soldiers had the best equipment. He worked at General Electric in Schenectady, New York after the war, doing groundbreaking work on x-ray microscopes, and finished his career as the head of research in a small company he helped found. In between he raised 5 children, was a volunteer with the Boy Scouts of America, and worked with his hands in and around the home he and his wife bought to raise their children in. Sterling also found time to help other parents get up a bond fund to build new schools and served as a school board member for many years. In this capacity he lent his voice to make sure every child had access to a well-rounded education in high school. In between all this life’s work he found time to write some poetry."
