= Janos Kirz =

American physicist

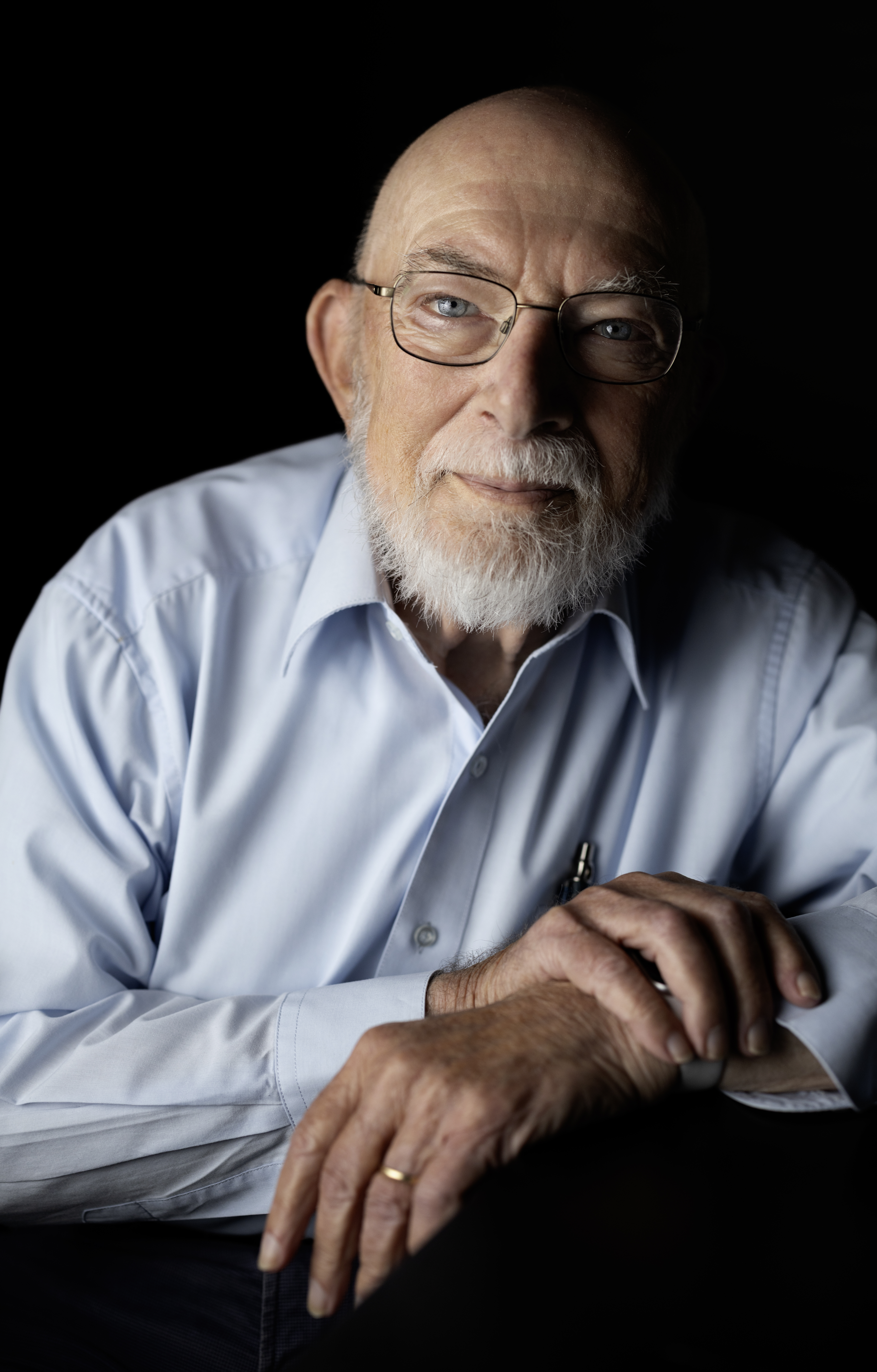
- Janos Kirz in 2025
- Born: 1937; Budapest, Hungary
- Education: University of California, Berkeley
- Known for: X-ray microscopy Zone plates
- Awards: Arthur H. Compton Award (2005)
- Scientific career
- Fields: Physics
- Workplaces: Stony Brook University; Lawrence Berkeley National Laboratory
- Doctoral advisor: Luis Walter Alvarez; Robert D. Tripp

Janos Kirz (born 1937) is a Hungarian-American physicist, professor emeritus at Stony Brook University, and pioneer of X-ray microscopy.

== Biography ==
Born in Budapest, Hungary, Kirz emigrated to the United States in late 1956 after the Hungarian Revolution of 1956. Kirz earned a Bachelor of Arts in physics from the University of California, Berkeley in 1959 and received his PhD in physics from the same institution in 1963. He then spent 1963–1964 as a postdoctoral fellow at the French Atomic Energy Commission (Commissariat à l’énergie atomique et aux énergies alternatives) in Saclay. In 1968 Kirz took a position at Stony Brook University where he was appointed professor in 1973. Kirz is the nephew of physicist Edward Teller.

== Research ==
Kirz’s research centers on the development of soft X-ray microscopy techniques using Fresnel zone plates and the application of these methods to biological and materials science investigations.

== Awards ==
- 1970 - Alfred P. Sloan Fellowship
- 1985 - Guggenheim Fellowship
- 2005 - Arthur H. Compton Award from the Advanced Photon Source for "Pioneering and developing the field of x-ray microscopy using Fresnel zone plates". Shared with Günter Schmahl.

== Publications ==
- Kirz, Janos (1974). "Phase zone plates for x rays and the extreme uv". Journal of the Optical Society of America. 65 (3): 301–309. doi:10.1364/JOSA.64.000301.
- Kirz, Janos; Jacobsen, Chris; Howells, Malcolm (1995). "Soft X-ray microscopes and their biological applications". Quarterly Reviews of Biophysics. 28 (1): 33–130. doi:10.1017/S0033583500003139. PMID 7676009. S2CID 37999221.
