= Albert Baez =

Mexican-American physicist (1912–2007)

- Born: November 15, 1912; Puebla, Puebla, Mexico
- Died: March 20, 2007 (aged 94); San Mateo County, California, U.S.
- Citizenship: Mexico, United States
- Education: Drew University (B.S., 1933); Syracuse University (M.S., 1935); Stanford University (Ph.D., 1950)
- Known for: X-ray microscopy; Physics education; Pacifist
- Spouse: Joan Chandos Bridge
- Children: 3, including Joan Baez and Mimi Fariña
- Awards: Dennis Gabor Award (1991)
- Scientific career
- Fields: Physics
- Doctoral advisor: Paul Kirkpatrick

Albert Vinicio Báez (/ˈbaɪ.ɛz/ BY-ez; Spanish: [biˈnisjo ˈβaes]; November 15, 1912 – March 20, 2007) was a Mexican-American physicist and the father of singers Joan Baez and Mimi Fariña, and an uncle of John C. Baez. He made important contributions to the early development of X-ray microscopes, X-ray optics, and later X-ray telescopes.

== Early life ==
Albert Báez was born in Puebla, Mexico, in 1912 to Alberto B. Báez and Thalia Báez. His father was a Methodist minister and his mother was a social worker for the YWCA. Albert was four when his father moved his family to the United States, first to Texas for a year and then to New York City. Albert, his sister Mimi and brother Peter were raised in Brooklyn where his father founded the First Spanish Methodist Church in New York. During his youth, Baez contemplated becoming a minister, but he followed his interests in mathematics and physics instead.

Báez earned degrees in mathematics and physics from Drew University (BS, 1933) and mathematics from Syracuse University (MS, 1935). He married Joan Chandos Bridge, the daughter of an Episcopalian priest, in 1936. The couple became Quakers. The two had three daughters (Pauline, Joan, and Mimi), then moved to California: Báez enrolled at Stanford's doctoral program in physics. Baez taught at Wagner College from 1940 to 1944, and then moved to Stanford University in 1944 where he taught undergraduate courses in physics and mathematics. In 1948, Báez co-invented, with his doctoral program advisor, Paul Kirkpatrick, the X-ray reflection microscope for examination of living cells. This microscope is still used in medicine. Baez received his Ph.D. in physics from Stanford in 1950, and wrote his thesis titled "Principles of X-Ray Optics and the Development of a Single State X-Ray Microscope". In 1948, while still a graduate student at Stanford, he developed concentric circles of alternating opaque and transparent materials to use diffraction instead of refraction to focus X-rays. These zone plates proved useful and even essential decades later only with the development of sufficiently bright, high intensity, synchrotron X-ray sources.

== Academic life ==
As the Cold War intensified in the 1950s, Báez's talent was in high demand in the burgeoning arms race, yet his family's pacifism moved him to refuse lucrative defense industry positions, and he devoted himself instead to education and humanitarianism.

From 1950 to 1956, he held a professorship at the University of Redlands, where he continued his X-ray research. Báez took leave for a year to work with UNESCO in 1951, and stationed his family in Baghdad to establish the physics department and laboratory at Baghdad University. In 1956, Báez returned to Stanford and began to work with Jerrold R. Zacharias. Together, they worked on the Physics Science Study Committee, which was an effort to reshape the way physics was taught in high schools. In 1959, Báez accepted a faculty position at MIT and moved his family to the Boston area. Báez worked on physics education with the Physical Science Study Committee, in particular, focused on producing films. In 1960, working with the Smithsonian Astrophysical Observatory in Cambridge, he developed optics for an X-ray telescope. Later that year he moved his family to Claremont, California, where he joined the faculty at Harvey Mudd College. From 1961 to 1967, he served as the first director of the science education program for UNESCO in Paris. Here, he helped to develop projects in the basic sciences in Asia, Africa, Latin America, and the Arab states.

Báez was the author of the textbook The New College Physics: A Spiral Approach (1967). He was the co-author of the textbook The Environment and Science and Technology Education (1987), and the memoir, A Year in Baghdad (1988), written with his wife Joan. Báez made nearly a hundred films on physics from 1967 to 1974 for the Encyclopædia Britannica Educational Corp. Báez chaired the Commission on Education of the International Union for Conservation of Nature and Natural Resources from 1979 to 1983.

On 22 June 1974, Britain's Open University awarded Báez an honorary degree as Doctor of the university.

== Retirement ==
After his retirement, Báez occasionally delivered physics lectures and was the president of Vivamos Mejor/USA in 1986, an organization founded in 1988 to help impoverished villages in Mexico. Its projects include preschool education, environmental projects, and community and educational activities. Báez strongly supported expanding science education across curriculums and across grade-levels. His lectures often included the "importance of the 3 Cs- curiosity, creativity, and compassion." In 1991, the International Society for Optical Engineering awarded him and Kirkpatrick the Dennis Gabor Award for pioneering contributions to the development of X-ray imaging microscopes and X-ray imaging telescopes. In 1995, the Hispanic Engineer National Achievement Awards Corporation (HENAAC) established the Albert V. Baez Award for Technical Excellence and Service to Humanity. Báez himself was inducted into the HENAAC Hall of Fame in 1998.

Báez was the father of folk singers Joan Baez and Mimi Fariña, whom he encouraged to enjoy music and the arts, and of Pauline Bryan; he also was the uncle of mathematical physicist John Báez. He had three grandchildren and one great-granddaughter. He died of natural causes on March 20, 2007, at age 94 in the Redwood City care home where he had lived for the prior three years. Báez had been divorced from his wife, Joan Bridge Baez, for several years, at the time of his death. According to the singer Joan Baez, speaking at the 2009 Newport Folk Festival, her parents married each other a second time before his death. His obituary in the New York Times states that "his survivors include his wife, Joan Bridge Báez of Woodside, Calif."

== Publications ==
- Báez, Albert V. (1967). The New College Physics: A Spiral Approach. W.H. Freeman and Company.
