= Optical window =

Atmospheric window

Rough plot of Earth's atmospheric transmittance (or opacity) to various wavelengths of electromagnetic radiation, including visible light.

The optical window is the portion of the optical spectrum that is not blocked by the Earth's atmosphere. The window runs from around 300 nanometers (ultraviolet-B) up into the range the human eye can detect, roughly 400–700 nm and continues up to approximately 2 μm. Sunlight mostly reaches the ground through the optical atmospheric window; the Sun is particularly active in most of this range (44% of the radiation emitted by the Sun falls within the visible spectrum and 49% falls within the infrared spectrum).

== Definition ==
The Earth's atmosphere is not totally transparent and is in fact 100% opaque to many wavelengths (see plot of Earth's opacity); the wavelength ranges to which it is transparent are called atmospheric windows.

=== Disambiguation of the term 'optical spectrum' ===
Although the word optical, deriving from Ancient Greek ὀπτῐκός (optikós, "of or for sight"), generally refers to something visible or visual, the term optical spectrum is used to describe the sum of the visible, the ultraviolet and the infrared spectra (at least in this context).

=== Optical atmospheric window ===
Solar irradiance spectrum above atmosphere and at surface. Extreme UV and X-rays are produced (at left of wavelength range shown) but comprise very small amounts of the Sun's total output power.

The optical atmospheric window is the optical portion of the electromagnetic spectrum that passes through the Earth's atmosphere, excluding its infrared part; although the optical spectrum also includes the IR spectrum and thus the optical window could include the infrared window (8 – 14 μm), the latter is considered separate by convention, since the visible spectrum is not contained in it.

== Historical importance for observational astronomy ==
Up until the 1940s, astronomers could only use the visible and near infrared portions of the optical spectrum for their observations. The first great astronomical discoveries such as the ones made by the famous Italian polymath Galileo Galilei were made using optical telescopes that received light reaching the ground through the optical window. After the 1940s, the development of radio telescopes gave rise to the even more successful field of radio astronomy that utilized the radio window. Starting in 1968, space telescopes have been deployed to observe wavelengths that would be blocked by the atmosphere. Since the 2010s it has been possible to avoid the problem of atmospheric absorption using neutrino and gravitational-wave astronomy, since these techniques are not based on optical phenomena.

== See also ==
- Infrared (atmospheric) window
- Optical window in biological tissue
- Radio window
