= Infrared window =

Atmospheric window

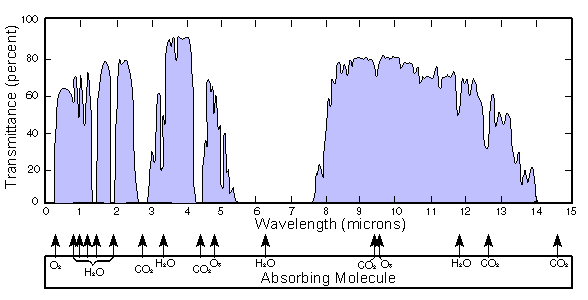
As the main part of the 'window' spectrum, a clear electromagnetic spectral transmission 'window' can be seen between 8 and 14 μm. A fragmented part of the 'window' spectrum (one might say a louvred part of the 'window') can also be seen in the visible to mid-wavelength infrared between 0.2 and 5.5 μm.

The infrared atmospheric window is an atmospheric window in the infrared spectrum where there is relatively little absorption of terrestrial thermal radiation by atmospheric gases. The window plays an important role in the atmospheric greenhouse effect by maintaining the balance between incoming solar radiation and outgoing IR to space. In the Earth's atmosphere this window is roughly the region between 8 and 14 μm although it can be narrowed or closed at times and places of high humidity because of the strong absorption in the water vapor continuum or because of blocking by clouds. It covers a substantial part of the spectrum from surface thermal emission which starts at roughly 5 μm. Principally it is a large gap in the absorption spectrum of water vapor. Carbon dioxide plays an important role in setting the boundary at the long wavelength end. Ozone partly blocks transmission in the middle of the window.

The importance of the infrared atmospheric window in the atmospheric energy balance was discovered by George Simpson in 1928, based on G. Hettner's 1918 laboratory studies of the gap in the absorption spectrum of water vapor. In those days, computers were not available, and Simpson notes that he used approximations; he writes about the need for this in order to calculate outgoing IR radiation: "There is no hope of getting an exact solution; but by making suitable simplifying assumptions ... ." Nowadays, accurate line-by-line computations are possible, and careful studies of the spectroscopy of infrared atmospheric gases have been published.

== Mechanisms ==
The principal natural greenhouse gases in order of their importance are water vapor H_{2}O, carbon dioxide CO_{2}, ozone O_{3}, methane CH_{4} and nitrous oxide N_{2}O. The concentration of the least common of these, N_{2}O, is about 400 ppb (by volume). Other gases which contribute to the greenhouse effect are present at ppt levels. These include the chlorofluorocarbons (CFCs), halons and hydrofluorocarbons (HFC and HCFCs). As discussed below, a major reason that they are so effective as greenhouse gases is that they have strong vibrational bands that fall in the infrared atmospheric window. IR absorption by CO_{2} at 14.7 μm sets the long wavelength limit of the infrared atmospheric window together with absorption by rotational transitions of H_{2}O at slightly longer wavelengths. The short wavelength boundary of the atmospheric IR window is set by absorption in the lowest frequency vibrational bands of water vapor. There is a strong band of ozone at 9.6 μm in the middle of the window which is why it acts as such a strong greenhouse gas. Water vapor has a continuum absorption due to collisional broadening of absorption lines which extends through the window. Local very high humidity can completely block the infrared vibrational window.

Over the Atlas Mountains, interferometrically recorded spectra of outgoing longwave radiation show emission that has arisen from the land surface at a temperature of about 320 K and passed through the atmospheric window, and non-window emission that has arisen mainly from the troposphere at temperatures about 260 K.

Over Côte d'Ivoire, interferometrically recorded spectra of outgoing longwave radiation show emission that has arisen from the cloud tops at a temperature of about 265 K and passed through the atmospheric window, and non-window emission that has arisen mainly from the troposphere at temperatures about 240 K. This means that, at the scarcely absorbed continuum of wavelengths (8 to 14 μm), the radiation emitted, by the Earth's surface into a dry atmosphere, and by the cloud tops, mostly passes unabsorbed through the atmosphere, and is emitted directly to space; there is also partial window transmission in far infrared spectral lines between about 16 and 28 μm. Clouds are excellent emitters of infrared radiation. Window radiation from cloud tops arises at altitudes where the air temperature is low, but as seen from those altitudes, the water vapor content of the air above is much lower than that of the air at the land-sea surface. Moreover, the water vapour continuum absorptivity, molecule for molecule, decreases with pressure decrease. Thus water vapour above the clouds, besides being less concentrated, is also less absorptive than water vapour at lower altitudes. Consequently, the effective window as seen from the cloud-top altitudes is more open, with the result that the cloud tops are effectively strong sources of window radiation; that is to say, in effect the clouds obstruct the window only to a small degree (see another opinion about this, proposed by Ahrens (2009) on page 43).

== Importance for life ==
Without the infrared atmospheric window, the Earth would become much too warm to support life, and possibly so warm that it would lose its water, as Venus did early in Solar System history. Thus, the existence of an atmospheric window is critical to Earth remaining a habitable planet.

As a proposed management strategy for global warming, passive daytime radiative cooling (PDRC) surfaces use the infrared window to send heat back into outer space with the aim of reversing rising temperature increases caused by climate change.

== Threats ==
In recent decades, the existence of the infrared atmospheric window has become threatened by the development of highly unreactive gases containing bonds between fluorine and carbon, sulfur or nitrogen. The impact of these compounds was first discovered by Indian–American atmospheric scientist Veerabhadran Ramanathan in 1975, one year after Rowland and Molina's much-more-celebrated paper on the ability of chlorofluorocarbons to destroy stratospheric ozone.

The "stretching frequencies" of bonds between fluorine and other light nonmetals are such that strong absorption in the atmospheric window will always be characteristic of compounds containing such bonds, although fluorides of nonmetals other than carbon, nitrogen or sulfur are short-lived due to hydrolysis. This absorption is strengthened because these bonds are highly polar due to the extreme electronegativity of the fluorine atom. Bonds to chlorine and bromine also absorb in the atmospheric window, though much less strongly.

Moreover, the unreactive nature of such compounds that makes them so valuable for many industrial purposes means that they are not removable in the natural circulation of the Earth's lower atmosphere. Extremely small natural sources created by means of radioactive oxidation of fluorite and subsequent reaction with sulfate or carbonate minerals produce via degassing atmospheric concentrations of about 40 ppt for all perfluorocarbons and 0.01 ppt for sulfur hexafluoride, but the only natural ceiling is via photolysis in the mesosphere and upper stratosphere. It is estimated that perfluorocarbons (CF_{4}, C_{2}F_{6}, C_{3}F_{8}), originating from commercial production of anesthetics, refrigerants, and polymers can stay in the atmosphere for between two thousand six hundred and fifty thousand years.

This means that such compounds possess enormous global warming potential. One kilogram of sulfur hexafluoride will, for example, cause as much warming as 26.7 tonnes of carbon dioxide over 100 years, and as much as 37.6 tonnes over 500 years. Perfluorocarbons are similar in this respect, and even carbon tetrachloride (CCl_{4}) has a global warming potential of 2310 compared to carbon dioxide. Quite short-lived halogenated compounds can still have fairly high global warming potentials: for instance chloroform, with a lifetime of 0.5 years, still has a global warming potential of 22; halothane, with a lifetime of only one year, has a GWP of 47 over 100 years, and Halon 1202, with a lifetime of 2.9 years, has a 100 year global warming potential 231 times that of carbon dioxide. These compounds still remain highly problematic with an ongoing effort to find substitutes for them.

== See also ==
- Greenhouse effect
- Greenhouse gas
- Infrared astronomy
- Optical window
- Ozone depletion
- Radio window

== Books ==
- Mihalas, D.; Weibel-Mihalas, B. (1984). Foundations of Radiation Hydrodynamics. Oxford University Press. ISBN 0-19-503437-6. Archived from the original on 2011-10-08.
