= Water vapor windows =

Atmospheric transmission of radiation

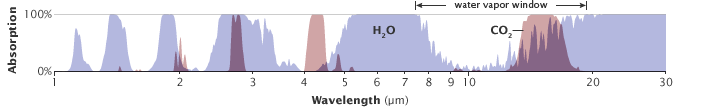
Water vapor window with micro-windows visible

Water vapor windows are wavelengths of infrared light that have little absorption by water vapor in Earth's atmosphere. Because of this weak absorption, these wavelengths are allowed to reach the Earth's surface barring effects from other atmospheric components. This process is highly impacted by greenhouse gases because of the effective emission temperature. The water vapor continuum and greenhouse gases are significantly linked due to water vapor's benefits on climate change.

== Definition ==
Water vapor is a gas that absorbs many wavelengths of Infrared (IR) energy in the Earth's atmosphere, and these wavelength ranges that can partially reach the surface are coming through what is called 'water vapor windows'. However, these windows do not absorb all of the infrared light, and electromagnetic energy is allowed to freely flow as a result. Astronomers can view the Universe with IR telescopes, called Infrared astronomy, because of these windows.

The mid-infrared window, which has a range of 800–1250 cm^-1, is one of the more significant windows, for it has a massive influence on radiation fluxes in high humidity areas of the atmosphere. There has also been increased attention on the windows at 4700 cm^-1 and 6300 cm^-1 since their water vapor micro-windows confirm that uncertainties in water vapor window parameters only occur at the edges. Moreover, the net incoming solar shortwave radiation and the net outgoing terrestrial longwave radiation at the top of the atmosphere keep the Earth's energy balance in check.

== Greenhouse Effect's Impact ==
Water vapor windows are also impacted by greenhouse gases since the water cycle is greatly accelerated due to these gases. The global averaged value of emitted, longwave radiation is 238.5 Wm^-2. One may get the effective emission temperature of the globe by assuming that the Earth-atmosphere system radiates as a blackbody in accordance with the Stefan-Boltzmann equation of blackbody radiation. The resultant temperature is -18.7 °C. Compared to +14.5 °C, the average worldwide temperature of the Earth's surface is 33 °C cooler. Thus, the Earth's surface is up to 33 °C warmer than it would be without the atmosphere. Moreover, the observation of longwave radiation demonstrates that the greenhouse effect exists in the Earth's atmosphere. These windows also allow orbiting satellites to measure the IR energy leaving the planet, the SSTs, and other important matters. See Electromagnetic absorption by water: Atmospheric effects.

Water vapor absorbing these wavelengths of IR energy is mainly attributed to water being a polar molecule. Water's polarity allows it to absorb and release radiation at far, near and mid-infrared wavelengths. The polarity also largely impacts how water interacts with nature, for it allows complexes of water, such as the water dimer.

== Water Vapor Continuum ==
Being one of the planet's most significant gases in the atmosphere, water vapor is important to study due to its benefits to climate change. Water vapor absorption mostly occurs in what is called the water vapor continuum, which is a combination of bands and windows that heavily influence radiation in the atmosphere. This continuum has two parts, which are the self-continuum and the foreign continuum. The self-continuum has a negative dependence on temperature, and the self-continuum is significantly stronger at the edges of the windows.

== Background ==
These windows were originally discovered by John Tyndall. He discovered that most of the infrared coming from the Universe is being blocked and then absorbed by water vapor and other greenhouse gases in the Earth's atmosphere.

== See also ==
- Greenhouse gas
- Effective temperature
- Infrared astronomy
- Electromagnetic spectrum
- Electromagnetic absorption by water
