= Paul H. Kirkpatrick =

Paul H. Kirkpatrick (July 21, 1894 – December 26, 1992) was co-inventor of the X-ray reflection microscope, and the imaging technique he and his graduate student Albert Baez developed is still used, particularly in astronomy to take X-ray pictures of galaxies and in medicine. An award in his name was established in the Physics Department at Stanford University to recognize those graduate students who have demonstrated a talent for and commitment to the teaching of physics to undergraduates.
