= Windowing =

Windowing may refer to:

- Windowing system, a graphical user interface (GUI) which implements windows as a primary metaphor
- In signal processing, the application of a window function to a signal
- In computer networking, a flow control mechanism to manage the amount of transmitted data sent without receiving an acknowledgement (e.g. TCP windowing)
- Date windowing, a method to interpret a two-digit year as a regular four-digit year, see Year 2000 problem
- Address Windowing Extensions, a Microsoft Windows Application Programming Interface
- A process used to produce images in a computed tomography (CT) scan
- A method of publication wherein a work is published on different media at different times (e.g. first in cinemas, then on Blu-ray)

== See also ==
- Window (disambiguation)
- Windows (disambiguation)
