= Total external reflection =

Situation or phenomena, When light bounces off a material with a low index of refraction

Total external reflection is a phenomenon traditionally involving X-rays and extreme ultraviolet, but in principle any type of electromagnetic or other wave, closely related to total internal reflection.

Total internal reflection describes the fact that radiation (e.g. visible light) can, at certain angles, be totally reflected from an interface between two media of different indices of refraction (see Snell's law). Total internal reflection occurs when the first medium is optically denser than the second medium, and the incident angle is larger than the critical angle of the medium, for example, light that starts in water and bounces off the water-to-air interface.

Total external reflection is the situation where the light starts in air or vacuum (refractive index close to or equal to 1), and bounces off a material with index of refraction less than 1. For example, in the X-ray bandpass, the frequency-dependent refractive index is frequently slightly less than 1 for virtually all materials. This is a result of the frequency of the X-ray, $\omega$, being comparable to, or larger than most atomic binding frequencies in a material. The refractive index can be written as the square root of the dielectric function for relative permittivity from the Lorentz oscillator model (in SI units):

$$n (\omega) = \sqrt{\frac{\epsilon (\omega)}{\epsilon_0}} = \sqrt{1 - \frac{N q_e^2}{\epsilon_0 m_e} \sum_{j=1}^{Z} \frac{1}{\omega^2 - \omega_j^2 + i \omega \Gamma_j} } \approx 1 - \delta (\omega) + i \beta (\omega) ,$$

where $\delta(\omega)$ and $\beta (\omega)$ are small numbers, and $i$ is the imaginary unit. Additionally, $N$ is the number of atoms or molecules per unit volume with $Z$ scattering electrons. The critical angle for total external reflection is defined by the scenario where, neglecting $\beta (\omega)$, the refracted ray travels exactly parallel to the surface, as a limit of Snell's law. In terms of a grazing incidence angle, $\theta$, defined relative to a surface, this can be written as

$$\theta_c (\omega) = \arccos \left[ 1 - \delta(\omega) \right] \approx \sqrt{2 \delta(\omega)}.$$

In a scenario with $\beta (\omega) \to 0$ and $\theta < \theta_c (\omega)$, Fresnel reflectivity is unity in both orthogonal polarizations and the incident ray does not penetrate into the surface. However, taking into account $\beta (\omega)$ as an extinction coefficient shows that the refracted ray penetrates slightly into the material, leading to reflective losses from absorption. Referred to as total "external" reflection because the light bounces off the exterior of the material, this phenomenon of achieving high reflectivity for $\theta < \theta_c (\omega)$ makes it possible to focus X-rays, as in a Wolter telescope.
