= Electromagnetic spectrum =

Full range of electromagnetic radiation frequencies

A diagram of the electromagnetic spectrum, showing various properties across the range of frequencies and wavelengths

The electromagnetic spectrum is the full range of electromagnetic radiation, organized by frequency or wavelength. The spectrum is divided into separate bands, with different names for the electromagnetic waves within each band. From low to high frequency these are: radio waves, microwaves, infrared, visible light, ultraviolet, X-rays, and gamma rays. The electromagnetic waves in each of these bands have different characteristics, such as how they are produced, how they interact with matter, and their practical applications.

Radio waves, at the low-frequency end of the spectrum, have the lowest photon energy and the longest wavelengths—thousands of kilometers, or more. They can be emitted and received by antennas, and pass through the atmosphere, foliage, and most building materials.

Gamma rays, at the high-frequency end of the spectrum, have the highest photon energies and the shortest wavelengths—much smaller than an atomic nucleus. Gamma rays, X-rays, and extreme ultraviolet rays are called ionizing radiation because their high photon energy is able to ionize atoms, causing chemical reactions. Longer-wavelength radiation such as visible light is non-ionizing; the photons do not have sufficient energy to ionize atoms.

Throughout most of the electromagnetic spectrum, spectroscopy can be used to separate waves of different frequencies, so that the intensity of the radiation can be measured as a function of frequency or wavelength. Spectroscopy is used to study the interactions of electromagnetic waves with matter.

== History and discovery ==
1944 informational poster of the electromagnetic spectrum

In 1672 Isaac Newton submitted his first paper to the Royal Society, describing the range of colours that white light could be split into with a prism using the term spectrum. Newton showed that these colours were intrinsic to light and could be combined to recreate white light. Around 1801, Thomas Young performed a number of interference experiments that played a major role in the acceptance of the wave theory of light.

In 1800, William Herschel discovered infrared radiation. He was studying the temperature of different colours by moving a thermometer through light split by a prism. He noticed that the highest temperature was beyond red. He theorized that this temperature change was due to "calorific rays", a type of light ray that could not be seen. The next year, Johann Ritter, working at the other end of the spectrum, noticed what he called "chemical rays" (invisible light rays that induced certain chemical reactions). These behaved similarly to visible violet light rays, but were beyond them in the spectrum. They were later renamed ultraviolet radiation.

The study of electromagnetism began in 1820 when Hans Christian Ørsted discovered that electric currents produce magnetic fields (Oersted's law). Light was first linked to electromagnetism in 1845, when Michael Faraday noticed that the polarization of light traveling through a transparent material responded to a magnetic field (see Faraday effect). During the 1860s, James Clerk Maxwell developed four partial differential equations (Maxwell's equations) for the electromagnetic field. Two of these equations predicted the possibility and behavior of waves in the field. Analyzing the speed of these theoretical waves, Maxwell realized that they must travel at a speed that was about the known speed of light. This startling coincidence in value led Maxwell to make the inference that light itself is a type of electromagnetic wave. Maxwell's equations predicted an infinite range of frequencies of electromagnetic waves, all traveling at the speed of light. This was the first indication of the existence of the entire electromagnetic spectrum.

Maxwell's predicted waves included waves at very low frequencies compared to infrared, which he hypothesized might be created by oscillating charges. Attempting to prove Maxwell's equations and detect such low frequency electromagnetic radiation, in 1886, the physicist Heinrich Hertz built an apparatus to generate and detect what are now called radio waves. Hertz found the waves and was able to infer (by measuring their wavelength and multiplying it by their frequency) that they traveled at the speed of light. Hertz also demonstrated that the new radiation could be both reflected and refracted by various dielectric media, in the same manner as light. For example, Hertz was able to focus the waves using a lens made of tree resin. In a later experiment, Hertz similarly produced and measured the properties of microwaves. These new types of waves paved the way for inventions such as the wireless telegraph and the radio.

In 1895, Wilhelm Röntgen noticed a new type of radiation emitted during an experiment with an evacuated tube subjected to a high voltage. He called this radiation "x-rays" and found that they were able to travel through parts of the human body but were reflected or stopped by denser matter such as bones. Before long, many uses were found for this radiography.

The last portion of the electromagnetic spectrum was filled in with the discovery of gamma rays. In 1900, Paul Villard was studying the radioactive emissions of radium when he identified a new type of radiation that he at first thought consisted of particles similar to known alpha and beta particles, but with the power of being far more penetrating than either. However, in 1910, British physicist William Henry Bragg demonstrated that gamma rays are electromagnetic radiation, not particles, and in 1914, Ernest Rutherford (who had named them gamma rays in 1903 when he realized that they were fundamentally different from charged alpha and beta particles) and Edward Andrade measured their wavelengths, and found that gamma rays were similar to X-rays, but with shorter wavelengths.

The wave-particle debate was rekindled in 1901 when Max Planck discovered that light is absorbed only in discrete "quanta", now called photons, implying that light has a particle nature. This idea was made explicit by Albert Einstein in 1905, but never accepted by Planck and many other contemporaries. The modern position of science is that electromagnetic radiation has both a wave and a particle nature, the wave-particle duality. The contradictions arising from this position are still being debated by scientists and philosophers.

== Range ==
Electromagnetic waves are typically described by any of the following three physical properties: the frequency f, wavelength λ, or photon energy E. Frequencies observed in astronomy range from 2.4×10^{23} Hz (1 GeV gamma rays) down to the local plasma frequency of the ionized interstellar medium (~1 kHz). Wavelength is inversely proportional to the wave frequency, so gamma rays have very short wavelengths that are fractions of the size of atoms, whereas wavelengths on the opposite end of the spectrum can be indefinitely long. Photon energy is directly proportional to the wave frequency, so gamma ray photons have the highest energy (around a billion electron volts), while radio wave photons have very low energy (around a femtoelectronvolt). These relations are illustrated by the following equations:

$$f = \frac{c}{\lambda}, \quad f = \frac{E}{h}, \quad E=\frac{hc}{\lambda},$$

where:

- c is the speed of light in vacuum
- h is the Planck constant.

Whenever electromagnetic waves travel in a medium with matter, their wavelength is decreased. Wavelengths of electromagnetic radiation, whatever medium they are traveling through, are usually quoted in terms of the vacuum wavelength, although this is not always explicitly stated.

Generally, electromagnetic radiation is classified by wavelength into radio wave, microwave, infrared, visible light, ultraviolet, X-rays and gamma rays. The behavior of EM radiation depends on its wavelength. When EM radiation interacts with single atoms and molecules, its behavior also depends on the amount of energy per quantum (photon) it carries.

Spectroscopy can detect a much wider region of the EM spectrum than the visible wavelength range of 400 nm to 700 nm in a vacuum. A common laboratory spectroscope can detect wavelengths from 2 nm to 2500 nm. Detailed information about the physical properties of objects, gases, or even stars can be obtained from this type of device. Spectroscopes are widely used in astrophysics. For example, many hydrogen atoms emit a radio wave photon that has a wavelength of 21.12 cm. Also, frequencies of 30 Hz and below can be produced by and are important in the study of certain stellar nebulae and frequencies as high as 2.9×10^{27} Hz have been detected from astrophysical sources.

== Regions ==
The electromagnetic spectrum

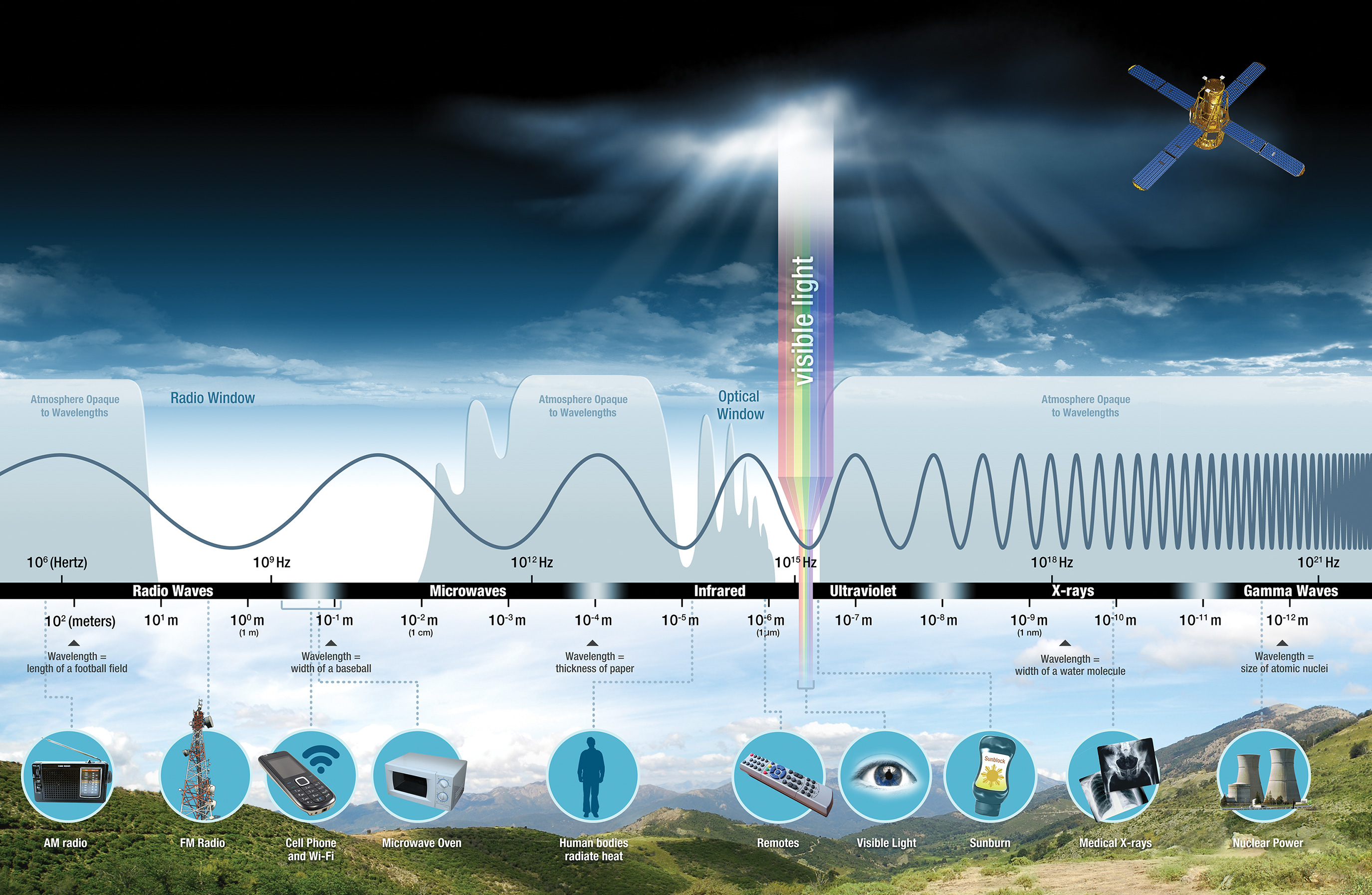
A visualization of the electromagnetic spectrum.

The types of electromagnetic radiation are broadly classified into the following classes (regions, bands or types):

1. Gamma radiation
2. X-ray radiation
3. Ultraviolet radiation
4. Visible light (light that humans can see)
5. Infrared radiation
6. Microwave radiation
7. Radio waves

This classification goes in the increasing order of wavelength, which is characteristic of the type of radiation.

There are no precisely defined boundaries between the bands of the electromagnetic spectrum; rather they fade into each other like the bands in a rainbow. Radiation of each frequency and wavelength (or in each band) has a mix of properties of the two regions of the spectrum that bound it. For example, red light resembles infrared radiation, in that it can excite and add energy to some chemical bonds and indeed must do so to power the chemical mechanisms responsible for photosynthesis and the working of the visual system.

The energy of X-rays and gamma rays overlap; usually if the source of the radiation is an electronic transition in an atom it will be called an x-ray, but if the source is nuclear decay it will be called a gamma ray. Electronic transitions in muonic atoms transitions are also said to produce X-rays. In astrophysics, energies below 100 keV are called X-rays and higher energies are gamma rays.

The region of the spectrum where electromagnetic radiation is observed may differ from the region it was emitted in due to relative velocity of the source and observer, (the Doppler shift), relative gravitational potential (gravitational redshift), or expansion of the universe (cosmological redshift). For example, the cosmic microwave background, relic blackbody radiation from the era of recombination, started out at energies around 1 eV, but has undergone enough cosmological red shift to put it into the microwave region of the spectrum for observers on Earth.

Class			Wave- length $\lambda$	Freq- uency $f$	Energy per photon $E$
Ionizing radiation	γ	Gamma rays	10 pm	30 EHz	124 keV
Ionizing radiation	γ	Gamma rays	100 pm	3 EHz	12.4 keV
Ionizing radiation	HX	Hard X-rays	100 pm	3 EHz	12.4 keV
Ionizing radiation	SX	Soft X-rays	10 nm	30 PHz	124 eV
Ionizing radiation	EUV	Extreme ultraviolet	121 nm	3 PHz	10.2 eV
	NUV	Near ultraviolet	400 nm	750 THz	3.1 eV
		Visible spectrum	700 nm	480 THz	1.77 eV
Infrared	NIR	Near infrared	1 μm	300 THz	1.24 eV
Infrared	NIR	Near infrared	10 μm	30 THz	124 meV
Infrared	MIR	Mid infrared	10 μm	30 THz	124 meV
Infrared	MIR	Mid infrared	100 μm	3 THz	12.4 meV
Infrared	FIR	Far infrared	100 μm	3 THz	12.4 meV
Infrared	FIR	Far infrared	1 mm	300 GHz	1.24 meV
Micro- waves	EHF	Extremely high frequency	1 mm	300 GHz	1.24 meV
Micro- waves	EHF	Extremely high frequency	1 cm	30 GHz	124 μeV
Micro- waves	SHF	Super high frequency	1 cm	30 GHz	124 μeV
Micro- waves	SHF	Super high frequency	1 dm	3 GHz	12.4 μeV
Micro- waves	UHF	Ultra high frequency	1 dm	3 GHz	12.4 μeV
Micro- waves	UHF	Ultra high frequency	1 m	300 MHz	1.24 μeV
Radio waves	VHF	Very high frequency	1 m	300 MHz	1.24 μeV
Radio waves	VHF	Very high frequency	10 m	30 MHz	124 neV
Radio waves	HF	High frequency	10 m	30 MHz	124 neV
Radio waves	HF	High frequency	100 m	3 MHz	12.4 neV
Radio waves	MF	Medium frequency	100 m	3 MHz	12.4 neV
Radio waves	MF	Medium frequency	1 km	300 kHz	1.24 neV
Radio waves	LF	Low frequency	1 km	300 kHz	1.24 neV
Radio waves	LF	Low frequency	10 km	30 kHz	124 peV
Radio waves	VLF	Very low frequency	10 km	30 kHz	124 peV
Radio waves	VLF	Very low frequency	100 km	3 kHz	12.4 peV
Radio waves	3	Band 3	100 km	3 kHz	12.4 peV
Radio waves	3	Band 3	1 Mm	300 Hz	1.24 peV
Radio waves	2	Band 2	1 Mm	300 Hz	1.24 peV
Radio waves	2	Band 2	10 Mm	30 Hz	124 feV
Radio waves	1	Band 1	10 Mm	30 Hz	124 feV
Radio waves	1	Band 1	100 Mm	3 Hz	12.4 feV
Sources Table shows the lower frequency limits (and higher wavelength limits) for the specified class Explanation of units and prefixes.: Unit / Abbreviation / Name / Scale; Wavelength / pm / picometer / 1×10^{−12} meters; Wavelength / nm / nanometer / 1×10^{−9} meters; Wavelength / μm / micrometer / 1×10^{−6} meters; Wavelength / mm / millimeter / 1×10^{−3} meters; Wavelength / cm / centimeter / 1×10^{−2} meters; Wavelength / dm / decimeter / 1×10^{−1} meters; Wavelength / m / meter / 1 meter; Wavelength / km / kilometer / 1×10^{3} meters; Wavelength / Mm / megameter / 1×10^{6} meters; Frequency / EHz / exaHertz / 1×10^{18} hertz; Frequency / PHz / petaHertz / 1×10^{15} hertz; Frequency / THz / teraHertz / 1×10^{12} hertz; Frequency / GHz / gigaHertz / 1×10^{9} hertz; Frequency / MHz / megaHertz / 1×10^{6} hertz; Frequency / KHz / kiloHertz / 1×10^{3} hertz; Frequency / Hz / Hertz / 1 Hertz; Energy Per Photon / keV / kilo-electronvolt / 1×10^{3} electronvolts; Energy Per Photon / eV / electronvolt / 1 electronvolt; Energy Per Photon / meV / milli-electronvolt / 1×10^{−3} electronvolts; Energy Per Photon / μeV / micro-electronvolt / 1×10^{−6}electronvolts; Energy Per Photon / neV / nano-electronvolt / 1×10^{−9} electronvolts; Energy Per Photon / peV / pico-electronvolt / 1×10^{−12} electronvolts; Energy Per Photon / feV / femto-electronvolt / 1×10^{−15} electronvolts

=== Rationale for names ===
Electromagnetic radiation interacts with matter in different ways across the spectrum. These types of interaction are so different that historically different names have been applied to different parts of the spectrum, as though these were different types of radiation. Thus, although these "different kinds" of electromagnetic radiation form a quantitatively continuous spectrum of frequencies and wavelengths, the spectrum remains divided for practical reasons arising from these qualitative interaction differences.

Electromagnetic radiation interaction with matter
Region of the spectrum	Main interactions with matter
Radio	Collective oscillation of charge carriers in bulk material (plasma oscillation). An example would be the oscillatory travels of the electrons in an antenna.
Microwave through far infrared	Plasma oscillation, molecular rotation
Near infrared	Molecular vibration, plasma oscillation (in metals only)
Visible	Molecular electron excitation (including pigment molecules found in the human retina), plasma oscillations (in metals only)
Ultraviolet	Excitation of molecular and atomic valence electrons, including ejection of the electrons (photoelectric effect)
X-rays	Excitation and ejection of core atomic electrons, Compton scattering (for low atomic numbers)
Gamma rays	Energetic ejection of core electrons in heavy elements, Compton scattering (for all atomic numbers), excitation of atomic nuclei, including dissociation of nuclei
High-energy gamma rays	Creation of particle-antiparticle pairs. At very high energies a single photon can create a shower of high-energy particles and antiparticles upon interaction with matter.

== Types of radiation ==
=== Radio waves ===
Radio waves are emitted and received by antennas, which consist of conductors such as metal rod resonators. In artificial generation of radio waves, an electronic device called a transmitter generates an alternating electric current which is applied to an antenna. The oscillating electrons in the antenna generate oscillating electric and magnetic fields that radiate away from the antenna as radio waves. In reception of radio waves, the oscillating electric and magnetic fields of a radio wave couple to the electrons in an antenna, pushing them back and forth, creating oscillating currents which are applied to a radio receiver. Earth's atmosphere is mainly transparent to radio waves, except for layers of charged particles in the ionosphere which can reflect certain frequencies.

Radio waves are extremely widely used to transmit information across distances in radio communication systems such as radio broadcasting, television, two way radios, mobile phones, communication satellites, and wireless networking. In a radio communication system, a radio frequency current is modulated with an information-bearing signal in a transmitter by varying either the amplitude, frequency or phase, and applied to an antenna. The radio waves carry the information across space to a receiver, where they are received by an antenna and the information extracted by demodulation in the receiver. Radio waves are also used for navigation in systems like Global Positioning System (GPS) and navigational beacons, and locating distant objects in radiolocation and radar. They are also used for remote control, and for industrial heating.

The use of the radio spectrum is strictly regulated by governments, coordinated by the International Telecommunication Union (ITU) which allocates frequencies to different users for different uses.

==== Microwaves ====
Plot of Earth's atmospheric opacity to various wavelengths of electromagnetic radiation. This is the surface-to-space opacity, the atmosphere is transparent to longwave radio transmissions within the troposphere but opaque to space due to the ionosphere.

Plot of atmospheric opacity for terrestrial to terrestrial transmission showing the molecules responsible for some of the resonances

Microwaves are radio waves of short wavelength, from about 10 centimeters to one millimeter, in the SHF and EHF frequency bands. Microwave energy is produced with klystron and magnetron tubes, and with solid state devices such as Gunn and IMPATT diodes. Although they are emitted and absorbed by short antennas, they are also absorbed by polar molecules, coupling to vibrational and rotational modes, resulting in bulk heating. Unlike higher frequency waves such as infrared and visible light which are absorbed mainly at surfaces, microwaves can penetrate into materials and deposit their energy below the surface. This effect is used to heat food in microwave ovens, and for industrial heating and medical diathermy. Microwaves are the main wavelengths used in radar, and are used for satellite communication, and wireless networking technologies such as Wi-Fi. The copper cables (transmission lines) which are used to carry lower-frequency radio waves to antennas have excessive power losses at microwave frequencies, and metal pipes called waveguides are used to carry them. Although at the low end of the band the atmosphere is mainly transparent, at the upper end of the band absorption of microwaves by atmospheric gases limits practical propagation distances to a few kilometers.

==== Terahertz radiation ====
Terahertz radiation, also known as sub-millimeter radiation, THF, T-rays, or T-light, is a region of the spectrum from about 100 GHz to 30 terahertz (THz) between microwaves and far infrared which can be regarded as belonging to either band. Until recently, the range was rarely studied and few sources existed for microwave energy in the so-called terahertz gap, but applications such as imaging and communications are now appearing. Scientists are also looking to apply terahertz technology in the armed forces, where high-frequency waves might be directed at enemy troops to incapacitate their electronic equipment. Terahertz radiation is strongly absorbed by atmospheric gases, making this frequency range useless for long-distance communication.

=== Infrared radiation ===
The infrared part of the electromagnetic spectrum covers the range from roughly 300 GHz to 400 THz (1 mm – 750 nm). It can be divided into three parts:

- Far-infrared, from 300 GHz to 30 THz (1 mm – 10 μm). The lower part of this range may also be called microwaves or terahertz waves. This radiation is typically absorbed by so-called rotational modes in gas-phase molecules, by molecular motions in liquids, and by phonons in solids. The water in Earth's atmosphere absorbs so strongly in this range that it renders the atmosphere in effect opaque. However, there are certain wavelength ranges ("windows") within the opaque range that allow partial transmission, and can be used for astronomy. The wavelength range from approximately 200 μm up to a few mm is often referred to as Submillimetre astronomy, reserving far infrared for wavelengths below 200 μm.
- Mid-infrared, from 30 THz to 120 THz (10–2.5 μm). Hot objects (black-body radiators) can radiate strongly in this range, and human skin at normal body temperature radiates strongly at the lower end of this region. This radiation is absorbed by molecular vibrations, where the different atoms in a molecule vibrate around their equilibrium positions. This range is sometimes called the fingerprint region, since the mid-infrared absorption spectrum of a compound is very specific for that compound.
- Near-infrared, from 120 THz to 400 THz (2,500–750 nm). Physical processes that are relevant for this range are similar to those for visible light. The highest frequencies in this region can be detected directly by some types of photographic film, and by many types of solid state image sensors for infrared photography and videography.

=== Visible light ===
sRGB rendering of the spectrum of visible light
Colour	Wavelength (nm)	Frequency (THz)	Photon energy (eV)
violet	380–450	670–790	2.75–3.26
blue	450–485	620–670	2.56–2.75
cyan	485–500	600–620	2.48–2.56
green	500–565	530–600	2.19–2.48
yellow	565–590	510–530	2.10–2.19
orange	590–625	480–510	1.98–2.10
red	625–750	400–480	1.65–1.98

Above infrared in frequency comes visible light. The sun emits its peak power in the visible region, although integrating the entire emission power spectrum through all wavelengths shows that it emits slightly more infrared than visible light. By definition, visible light is the part of the EM spectrum the human eye is the most sensitive to. Visible light (and near-infrared light) is typically absorbed and emitted by electrons in molecules and atoms that move from one energy level to another. This action allows the chemical mechanisms that underlie human vision and plant photosynthesis. The light that excites the human visual system is a very small portion of the electromagnetic spectrum. A rainbow shows the optical (visible) part of the electromagnetic spectrum; infrared (if it could be seen) would be located just beyond the red side of the rainbow whilst ultraviolet would appear just beyond the opposite violet end.

Electromagnetic radiation with a wavelength between 380 nm and 760 nm (400–790 terahertz) is detected by the human eye and perceived as visible light. Other wavelengths, especially near infrared (longer than 760 nm) and ultraviolet (shorter than 380 nm) are also sometimes referred to as light, especially when the visibility to humans is not relevant. White light is a combination of lights of different wavelengths in the visible spectrum. Passing white light through a prism splits it up into the several colours of light observed in the visible spectrum between 400 nm and 780 nm.

If radiation having a frequency in the visible region of the EM spectrum reflects off an object, say, a bowl of fruit, and then strikes the eyes, this results in visual perception of the scene. The brain's visual system processes the multitude of reflected frequencies into different shades and hues, and through this insufficiently understood psychophysical phenomenon, most people perceive a bowl of fruit.

At most wavelengths, however, the information carried by electromagnetic radiation is not directly detected by human senses. Natural sources produce EM radiation across the spectrum, and technology can also manipulate a broad range of wavelengths. Optical fiber transmits light that, although not necessarily in the visible part of the spectrum (it is usually infrared), can carry information. The modulation is similar to that used with radio waves.

=== Ultraviolet radiation ===
The amount of penetration of UV relative to altitude in Earth's ozone

Next in frequency comes ultraviolet (UV). In frequency (and thus energy), UV rays sit between the violet end of the visible spectrum and the X-ray range. The UV wavelength spectrum ranges from 399 nm to 10 nm and is divided into 3 sections: UVA, UVB, and UVC.

UV is the lowest energy range energetic enough to ionize atoms, separating electrons from them, thereby causing chemical reactions. UV, X-rays, and gamma rays are collectively called ionizing radiation; exposure to them can damage living tissue. UV can also cause substances to glow with visible light, a phenomenon called fluorescence. UV fluorescence has many practical applications, and is used in fields such as forensic science, conservation, medical imaging, and killing insects.

At the middle range of UV, UV rays cannot ionize but can break chemical bonds, making molecules unusually reactive. Sunburn, for example, is caused by the disruptive effects of middle range UV radiation on skin cells, which is the main cause of skin cancer. UV rays in the middle and shorter range can irreparably damage the complex DNA molecules in the cells producing thymine dimers making it a very potent mutagen. Sunscreen can protect against this radiation. Short range wavelengths are called UVC. UVB and UVC lights utilize the destructive nature of these wavelengths to sterilize, and have other scientific applications.

The sun emits UV radiation (about 10% of its total power), including extremely short wavelength UV that could potentially destroy most life on land (ocean water would provide some protection for life there). However, most of the sun's damaging UV wavelengths are absorbed by the atmosphere before they reach the surface. The higher energy (shortest wavelength) ranges of UV (called "vacuum UV") are absorbed by nitrogen and, at longer wavelengths, by simple diatomic oxygen in the air. Most of the UV in the mid-range of energy is blocked by the ozone layer, which absorbs strongly in the important 200–315 nm range, the lower energy part of which is too long for ordinary dioxygen in air to absorb. This leaves less than 3% of sunlight at sea level in UV, with all of this remainder at the lower energies. The remainder is UV-A, along with some UV-B. The very lowest energy range of UV between 315 nm and visible light (called UV-A) is not blocked well by the atmosphere, but does not cause sunburn and does less biological damage. However, it is not harmless and does create oxygen radicals, mutations and skin damage.

=== X-rays ===
After UV come X-rays, which, like the upper ranges of UV are also ionizing. However, due to their higher energies, X-rays can also interact with matter by means of the Compton effect. Hard X-rays have shorter wavelengths than soft X-rays and as they can pass through many substances with little absorption, they can be used to 'see through' objects with 'thicknesses' less than that equivalent to a few meters of water. One notable use is diagnostic X-ray imaging in medicine (a process known as radiography). X-rays are useful as probes in high-energy physics. In astronomy, the accretion disks around neutron stars and black holes emit X-rays, enabling studies of these phenomena. X-rays are also emitted by stellar corona and are strongly emitted by some types of nebulae. However, X-ray telescopes must be placed outside the Earth's atmosphere to see astronomical X-rays, since the great depth of the atmosphere of Earth is opaque to X-rays (with areal density of 1000 g/cm^{2}), equivalent to 10 meters thickness of water. This is an amount sufficient to block almost all astronomical X-rays (and also astronomical gamma rays—see below).

=== Gamma rays ===
After hard X-rays come gamma rays, discovered by Paul Ulrich Villard in 1900. These are the most energetic photons, having no defined lower limit to their wavelength. In astronomy they are valuable for studying high-energy objects or regions, however as with X-rays this can only be done with telescopes outside the Earth's atmosphere. Gamma rays are used experimentally by physicists for their penetrating ability and are produced by a number of radioisotopes. They are used for irradiation of foods and seeds for sterilization, and in medicine they are occasionally used in radiation cancer therapy. More commonly, gamma rays are used for diagnostic imaging in nuclear medicine, an example being PET scans. The wavelength of gamma rays can be measured with high accuracy through the effects of Compton scattering.

== See also ==
- Bandplan
- Cosmic ray
- Electroencephalography
- Infrared window
- Ionizing radiation
- Optical window
- Ozone layer
- Radiant energy
- Radiation
- Radio window
- Spectral imaging
- Spectroscopy
- V band
- W band
