= Radio window =

Region of the radio spectrum

Opacity of the Earth's atmosphere: the radio window spans larger wavelengths.

The radio window is the region of the radio spectrum that penetrates the Earth's atmosphere. Typically, the lower limit of the radio window's range has a value of about 10 MHz (λ ≈ 30 m); the best upper limit achievable from optimal terrestrial observation sites is equal to approximately 1 THz (λ ≈ 0.3 mm).

It plays an important role in astronomy; up until the 1940s, astronomers could only use the visible and near infrared spectra for their measurements and observations. With the development of radio telescopes, the radio window became more and more utilizable, leading to the development of radio astronomy that provided astrophysicists with valuable observational data.

== Factors affecting lower and upper limits ==
The lower and upper limits of the radio window's range of frequencies are not fixed; they depend on a variety of factors.

=== Absorption of mid-IR ===
The upper limit is affected by the vibrational transitions of atmospheric molecules such as oxygen (O_{2}), carbon dioxide (CO_{2}), and water (H_{2}O), whose energies are comparable to the energies of mid-infrared photons: these molecules largely absorb the mid-infrared radiation that heads towards Earth.

=== Ionosphere ===
The radio window's lower frequency limit is greatly affected by the ionospheric refraction of the radio waves whose frequencies are approximately below 30 MHz (λ > 10 m); radio waves with frequencies below the limit of 10 MHz (λ > 30 m) are reflected back into space by the ionosphere. The lower limit is proportional to the density of the ionosphere's free electrons and coincides with the plasma frequency:
$$f_p = 9 \sqrt{N_e},$$
where $f_p$ is the plasma frequency in Hz and $N_e$ the electron density in electrons per cubic meter. Since it is highly dependent on sunlight, the value of $N_e$ changes significantly from daytime to nighttime usually being lower during the day, leading to a decrease of the radio window's lower limit and higher during the night, causing an increase of the radio window's lower frequency end. However, this also depends on the solar activity and the geographic position.

=== Troposphere ===
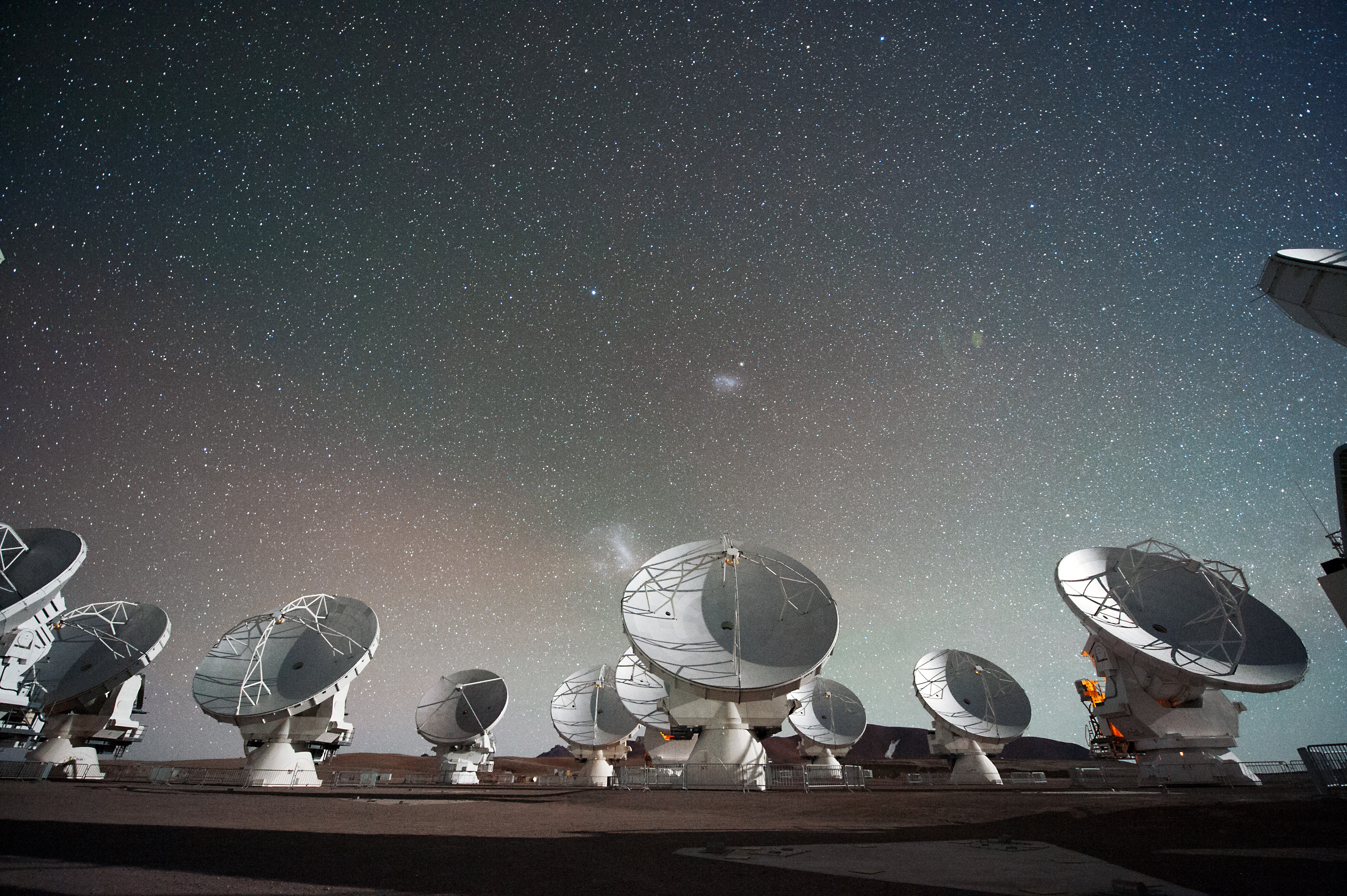
The Atacama Large Millimeter Array, an astronomical interferometer of 66 radio telescopes constructed on the 5,000 m (16,000 ft) elevation Chajnantor plateau in Chile.

When performing observations, radio astronomers try to extend the upper limit of the radio window towards the 1 THz optimum, since the astronomical objects give spectral lines of greater intensity in the higher frequency range. Tropospheric water vapour greatly affects the upper limit since its resonant absorption frequency bands are 22.3 GHz (λ ≈ 1.32 cm), 183.3 GHz (λ ≈ 1.64 mm) and 323.8 GHz (λ ≈ 0.93 mm). The tropospheric oxygen's bands at 60 GHz (λ ≈ 5.00 mm) and 118.74 GHz (λ ≈ 2.52 mm) also affect the upper limit. To tackle the issue of water vapour, many observatories are built at high altitudes where the climate is more dry. However, little can be done to avoid the oxygen's interference with radio waves propagation.

=== Radio frequency interference ===
The width of the radio window is also affected by radio frequency interference which hinders the observations at certain wavelength ranges and undermines the quality of the observational data of radio astronomy.

== See also ==
- Infrared window
- Optical window
- Radio propagation
