= Windows (disambiguation) =

Microsoft Windows is an operating system developed by Microsoft.

Windows may also refer to:

- The plural of window, an opening in an opaque surface through which light can pass

== Computing ==
- Win-OS/2
- Window (computing), a visual display area in a graphical user interface (GUI)
- Windows key, a key on some computer keyboards
- X Window System (often misnamed "X Windows"), a graphical user interface for many operating systems, especially Unix and Linux variants
  - OpenWindows, an implementation used in Solaris from 1989 to 2002
  - DECwindows, an implementation for VMS/OpenVMS

== Film and television ==
- Windows (film), a 1980 erotic thriller
- Windows (TV series), a 1955 American anthology series

== Music ==
- Windows (country-psych band), a Los Angeles band founded in 2018
- "Windows" (composition), a 1966 jazz standard by Chick Corea
- "Windows", a 1982 song on Vinyl Confessions by Kansas
- "Windows" (song), a 2023 song by Take That
- Windows (Jon Lord album), 1974
- Windows (Lee Konitz and Hal Galper album), 1975
- Windows (O'Donel Levy album), 1976
- Windows (Charlie Daniels album), 1982
- Windows (Amanda Somerville album), 2008

== See also ==
- Window (disambiguation)
- Windowing (disambiguation)
