= X-ray optics =

Branch of optics

X-ray optics is the branch of optics dealing with X-rays, rather than visible light. It deals with focusing and other ways of manipulating the X-ray beams for research techniques such as X-ray diffraction, X-ray crystallography, X-ray fluorescence, small-angle X-ray scattering, X-ray microscopy, X-ray phase-contrast imaging, and X-ray astronomy.

X-rays and visible light are both electromagnetic waves, and propagate in space in the same way, but because of the much higher frequency and photon energy of X-rays they interact with matter very differently. Visible light is easily redirected using lenses and mirrors, but because the real part of the complex refractive index of all materials is very close to 1 for X-rays, they instead tend to initially penetrate and eventually get absorbed in most materials without significant change of direction.

== X-ray techniques ==
There are many different techniques used to redirect X-rays, most of them changing the directions by only minute angles. The most common principle used is reflection at grazing incidence angles, either using total external reflection at very small angles or multilayer coatings. Other principles used include diffraction and interference in the form of zone plates, refraction in compound refractive lenses that use many small X-ray lenses in series to compensate by their number for the minute index of refraction, and Bragg reflection from a crystal plane in flat or bent crystals.

X-ray beams are often collimated (reduced in size) using pinholes or movable slits typically made of tungsten or some other high-Z material. Narrow parts of an X-ray spectrum can be selected with monochromators based on one or multiple Bragg reflections by crystals. X-ray spectra can also be manipulated by passing the X-rays through a filter that typically reduces the low-energy part of the spectrum, and possibly parts above absorption edges of the elements used for the filter.

== Focusing optics ==
Analytical X-ray techniques such as X-ray crystallography, small-angle X-ray scattering, wide-angle X-ray scattering, X-ray fluorescence, X-ray spectroscopy and X-ray photoelectron spectroscopy all benefit from high X-ray flux densities on the samples being investigated. This is achieved by focusing the divergent beam from the X-ray source onto the sample using one of several possible focusing optical components. This is also useful for scanning probe techniques such as scanning transmission X-ray microscopy and scanning X-ray fluorescence imaging.

=== Polycapillary optics ===
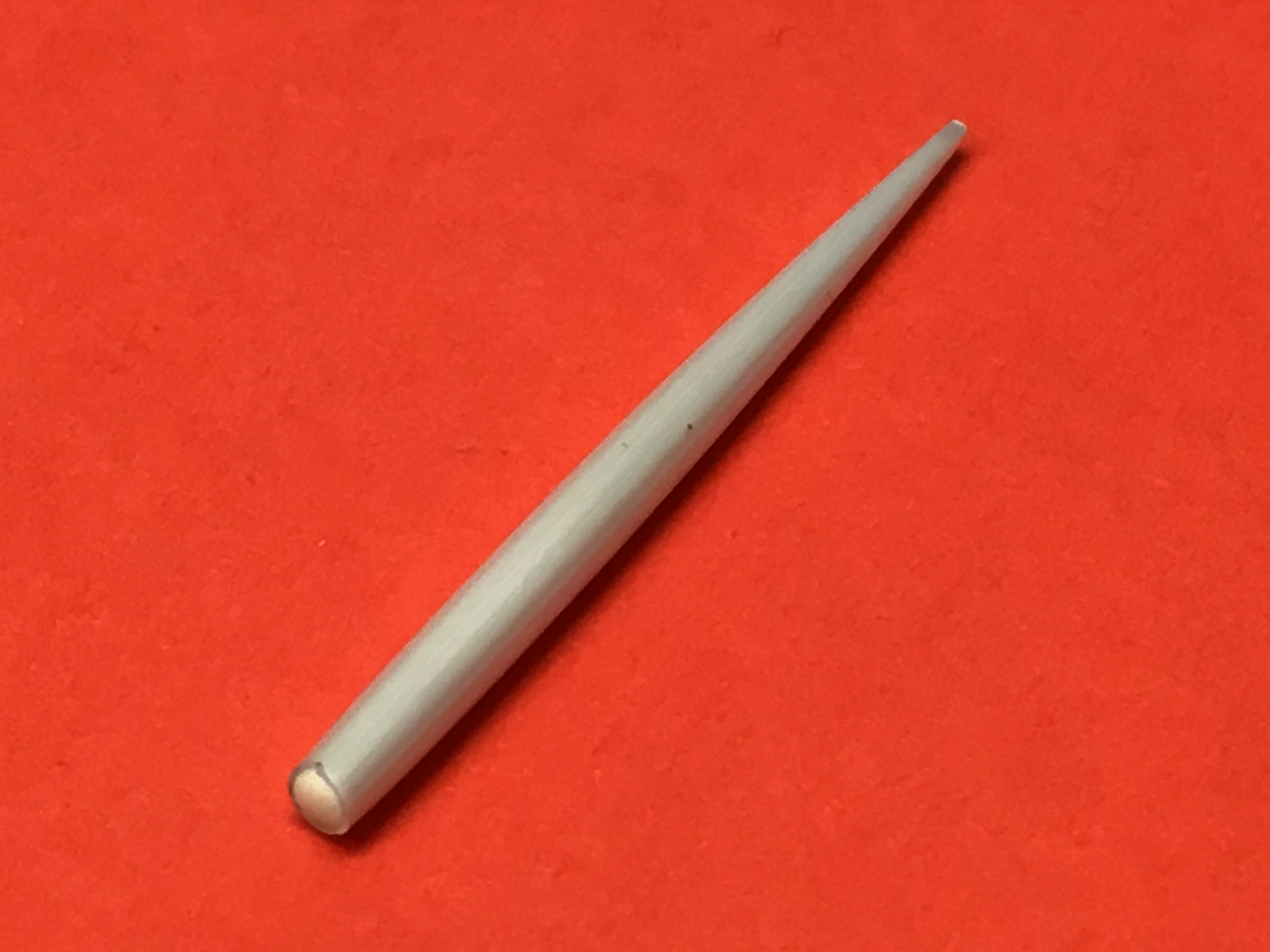
A polycapillary lens for focusing X-rays

Polycapillary lenses are arrays of small hollow glass tubes that guide the X-rays with many total external reflections on the inside of the tubes. The array is tapered so that one end of the capillaries points at the X-ray source and the other at the sample. Polycapillary optics are achromatic and thus suitable for scanning fluorescence imaging and other applications where a broad X-ray spectrum is useful. They collect X-rays efficiently for photon energies of 0.1 to 30 keV and can achieve gains of 100 to 10000 in flux over using a pinhole at 100 mm from the X-ray source. Since only X-rays entering the capillaries within a very narrow angle will be totally internally reflected, only X-rays coming from a small spot will be transmitted through the optic. Polycapillary optics cannot image more than one point to another, so they are used for illumination and collection of X-rays.

=== Zone plates ===
Zone plates consist of a substrate with concentric zones of a phase-shifting or absorbing material with zones getting narrower the larger their radius. The zone widths are designed so that a transmitted wave gets constructive interference in a single point giving a focus. Zone plates can be used as condensers to collect light, but also for direct full-field imaging in e.g. an X-ray microscope. Zone plates are highly chromatic and usually designed only for a narrow energy span, making it necessary to have monochromatic X-rays for efficient collection and high-resolution imaging.

=== Compound refractive lenses ===
Since refractive indices at X-ray wavelengths are so close to 1, the focal lengths of normal lenses get impractically long. To overcome this, lenses with very small radii of curvature are used, and they are stacked in long rows, so that the combined focusing power becomes appreciable. Since the refractive index is less than 1 for X-rays, these lenses must be concave to achieve focusing, contrary to visible-light lenses, which are convex for a focusing effect. Radii of curvature are typically less than one millimeter, making the usable X-ray beam width at most about 1 mm. To reduce the absorption of X-rays in these stacks, materials with very low atomic number such as beryllium or lithium are often used. Lenses from other materials are also available: radiation-resistant polymer (Epoxy based) such as SU-8, nickel and silicon. Since the refractive index depends strongly on X-ray wavelength, these lenses are highly chromatic, and the variation of the focal length with wavelength must be taken into account for any application.

== Reflection ==
Designs based on grazing-incidence reflection used in X-ray telescopes include that by Kirkpatrick–Baez, and several by Wolter (Wolter I–IV)

The basic idea is to reflect a beam of X-rays from a surface and to measure the intensity of X-rays reflected in the specular direction (reflected angle equal to incident angle). It has been shown that a reflection off a parabolic mirror followed by a reflection off a hyperbolic mirror leads to the focusing of X-rays. Since the incoming X-rays must strike the tilted surface of the mirror, the collecting area is small. It can, however, be increased by nesting arrangements of mirrors inside each other.

The ratio of reflected intensity to incident intensity is the X-ray reflectivity for the surface. If the interface is not perfectly sharp and smooth, the reflected intensity will deviate from that predicted by the Fresnel reflectivity law; the deviations can be analyzed to obtain the density profile of the interface normal to the surface. For films with multiple layers, X-ray reflectivity may show oscillations with wavelength, analogous to the Fabry–Pérot effect. These oscillations can be used to infer layer thicknesses and other properties.

== Diffraction ==
Symmetrically spaced atoms cause re-radiated X-rays to reinforce each other in the specific directions where their path-length difference 2d sin θ equals an integer multiple of the wavelength λ

In X-ray diffraction a beam strikes a crystal and diffracts into many specific directions. The angles and intensities of the diffracted beams indicate a three-dimensional density of electrons within the crystal. X-rays produce a diffraction pattern because their wavelength typically has the same order of magnitude (0.1–10.0 nm) as the spacing between the atomic planes in the crystal.

Each atom re-radiates a small portion of an incoming beam's intensity as a spherical wave. If the atoms are arranged symmetrically (as is found in a crystal) with a separation d, these spherical waves will be in phase (add constructively) only in directions where their path-length difference 2d sin θ is equal to an integer multiple of the wavelength λ. The incoming beam therefore appears to have been deflected by an angle 2θ, producing a reflection spot in the diffraction pattern.

X-ray diffraction is a form of elastic scattering in the forward direction; the outgoing X-rays have the same energy, and thus the same wavelength, as the incoming X-rays, only with altered direction. By contrast, inelastic scattering occurs when energy is transferred from the incoming X-ray to an inner-shell electron, exciting it to a higher energy level. Such inelastic scattering reduces the energy (or increases the wavelength) of the outgoing beam. Inelastic scattering is useful for probing such electron excitation, but not in determining the distribution of atoms within the crystal.

Longer-wavelength photons (such as ultraviolet radiation) would not have sufficient resolution to determine the atomic positions. At the other extreme, shorter-wavelength photons such as gamma rays are difficult to produce in large numbers, difficult to focus, and interact too strongly with matter, producing particle–antiparticle pairs.

Similar diffraction patterns can be produced by scattering electrons or neutrons. X-rays are usually not diffracted from atomic nuclei, but only from the electrons surrounding them.

== Interference ==
X-ray interference due to the superposition of two or more X-ray waves produces a new wave pattern. X-ray interference usually refers to the interaction of waves that are correlated or coherent with each other, either because they come from the same source or because they have the same or nearly the same frequency.

Two non-monochromatic X-ray waves are only fully coherent with each other if they both have exactly the same range of wavelengths and the same phase differences at each of the constituent wavelengths.

The total phase difference is derived from the sum of the path difference and the initial phase difference (if the X-ray waves are generated from two or more different sources). It can then be concluded whether the X-ray waves reaching a point are in phase (constructive interference) or out of phase (destructive interference).

== Technologies ==
There are a variety of techniques used to funnel X-ray photons to the appropriate location on an X-ray detector:

- Lobster-eye optics
- Grazing incidence mirrors in a Wolter telescope, or a Kirkpatrick–Baez X-ray reflection microscope.
- Zone plates.
- Bent crystals.
- Normal-incidence mirrors making use of multilayer coatings.
- A normal-incidence lens much like an optical lens, such as a compound refractive lens.
- Microstructured optical arrays, namely, capillary/polycapillary optical systems.
- Coded aperture imaging.
- Modulation collimators.
- X-ray waveguides.

Most X-ray optical elements (with the exception of grazing-incidence mirrors) are very small and must be designed for a particular incident angle and energy, thus limiting their applications in divergent radiation. As of 2009, although the technology had advanced rapidly, its practical uses outside research were limited. Efforts were ongoing to introduce X-ray optics in medical X-ray imaging. For instance, one of the applications showing greater promise is in enhancing both the contrast and resolution of mammographic images, compared to conventional anti-scatter grids. Another application is to optimize the energy distribution of the X-ray beam to improve contrast-to-noise ratio over conventional energy filtering.

== Mirrors for X-ray optics ==
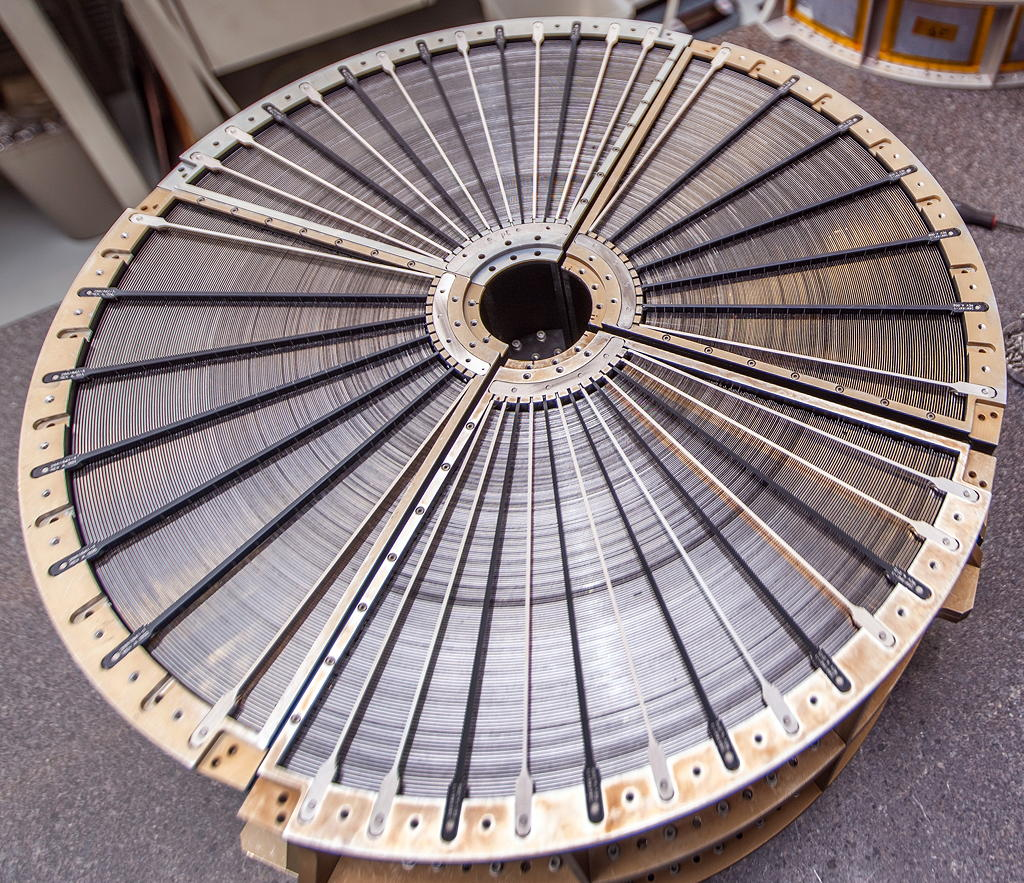
One of the mirrors of XRISM made of 203 foils

X-ray mirrors can be made of glass, ceramic, or metal foil, coated by a reflective layer. The most commonly used reflective materials for X-ray mirrors are gold and iridium. Even with these the critical reflection angle is energy-dependent. For gold at 1 keV, the critical reflection angle is 2.4°.

The use of X-ray mirrors simultaneously requires:

- the ability to determine the location of the arrival of an X-ray photon in two dimensions,
- a reasonable detection efficiency.

=== Multilayers for X-Rays ===
No material has substantial reflection for X-rays, except at very small grazing angles. Multilayers enhance the small reflectivity from a single boundary by adding the small reflected amplitudes from many boundaries coherently in phase. For example, if a single boundary has a reflectivity of R = 10^{−4} (amplitude r = 10^{−2}), then the addition of 100 amplitudes from 100 boundaries can give reflectivity R close to one. The period Λ of the multilayer that provides the in-phase addition is that of the standing wave produced by the input and output beam, Λ = λ/2 sin θ, where λ is the wavelength, and 2θ the half angle between the two beams. For θ = 90°, or reflection at normal incidence, the period of the multilayer is Λ = λ/2. The shortest period that can be used in a multilayer is limited by the size of the atoms to about 2 nm, corresponding to wavelengths above 4 nm. For shorter wavelength a reduction of the incidence angle θ toward more grazing has to be used.

The materials for multilayers are selected to give the highest possible reflection at each boundary and the smallest absorption or the propagation through the structure. This is usually achieved by light, low-density materials for the spacer layer and a heavier material that produces high contrast. The absorption in the heavier material can be reduced by positioning it close to the nodes of the standing-wave field inside the structure. Good low-absorption spacer materials are Be, C, B, B_{4}C and Si. Some examples of the heavier materials with good contrast are W, Rh, Ru and Mo.

Applications include:

- normal and grazing-incidence optics for telescopes from EUV to hard X-rays,
- microscopes, beam lines at synchrotron and FEL facilities,
- EUV lithography.

Mo/Si is the material selection used for the near-normal incidence reflectors for EUV lithography.

=== Hard X-ray mirrors ===
An X-ray mirror optic for the NuSTAR space telescope working at 79 keV (hard, i.e. high-energy X-radiation) was made using multilayered coatings, computer-aided manufacturing, and other techniques. The mirrors use a tungsten/silicon (W/Si) or platinum/silicon-carbide (Pt/SiC) multicoating on slumped glass, allowing a Wolter telescope design.

== See also ==
- Kirkpatrick–Baez mirror
- X-ray telescope
- Wolter telescope, a type of X-ray telescope built with glancing-incidence mirrors
- XMM-Newton and Chandra X-ray Observatory, orbiting observatories using X-ray optics
- X-ray spectroscopy, X-ray photoelectron spectroscopy, X-ray crystallography
