= X-ray microscope =

Type of microscope that uses X-rays

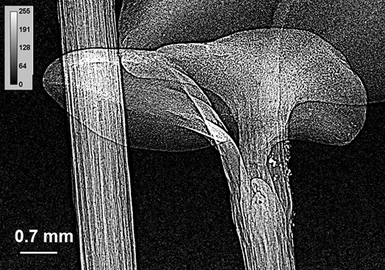
An X-ray microscopy image of a living 10-day-old canola plant

An X-ray microscope uses electromagnetic radiation in the X-ray band to produce magnified images of objects. Since X-rays penetrate most objects, there is no need to specially prepare them for X-ray microscopy observations.

Unlike visible light, X-rays do not reflect or refract easily and are invisible to the human eye. Therefore, an X-ray microscope exposes film or uses a charge-coupled device (CCD) detector to detect X-rays that pass through the specimen. It is a contrast imaging technology using the difference in absorption of soft X-rays in the water window region (wavelengths: 2.34–4.4 nm, energies: 280–530 eV) by the carbon atom (main element composing the living cell) and the oxygen atom (an element of water).

Microfocus X-ray also achieves high magnification by projection. A microfocus X-ray tube produces X-rays from an extremely small focal spot (5 μm down to 0.1 μm). The X-rays are in the more conventional X-ray range (20 to 300 keV) and are not re-focused.

== Invention and development ==
The history of X-ray microscopy can be traced back to the early 20th century. After the German physicist Röntgen discovered X-rays in 1895, scientists soon illuminated an object using an X-ray point source and captured the shadow images of the object with a resolution of several micrometers. In 1918, Einstein pointed out that the refractive index for X-rays in most mediums should be just slightly greater than 1, which means that refractive optical parts would be difficult to use for X-ray applications.

Early X-ray microscopes by Paul Kirkpatrick and Albert Baez used grazing-incidence reflective X-ray optics to focus the X-rays, which grazed X-rays off parabolic curved mirrors at a very high angle of incidence. An alternative method of focusing X-rays is to use a tiny Fresnel zone plate of concentric gold or nickel rings on a silicon dioxide substrate. Sir Lawrence Bragg produced some of the first usable X-ray images with his apparatus in the late 1940s.

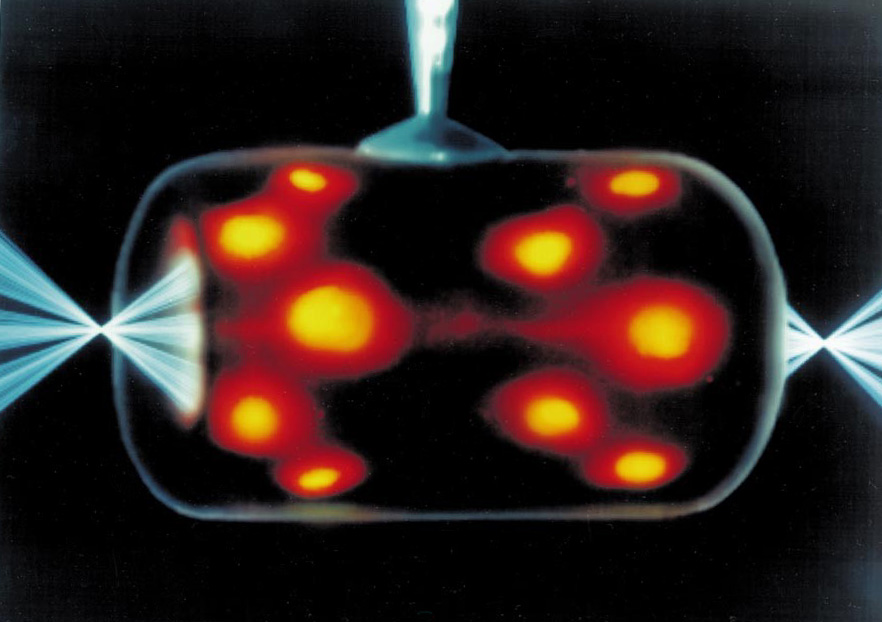
Indirect-drive laser inertial confinement fusion uses a "hohlraum" irradiated with laser beam cones from either side on its inner surface to bathe a fusion microcapsule inside with smooth high-intensity X-rays. The highest-energy X-rays that penetrate the hohlraum can be visualized using an X-ray microscope such as here, where X-radiation is represented in orange/red.

In the 1950s Sterling Newberry produced a shadow X-ray microscope, which placed the specimen between the source and a target plate, this became the basis for the first commercial X-ray microscopes from the General Electric Company.

After a silent period in the 1960s, X-ray microscopy regained people's attention in the 1970s. In 1972, Horowitz and Howell built the first synchrotron-based X-ray microscope at the Cambridge Electron Accelerator. This microscope scanned samples using synchrotron radiation from a tiny pinhole and showed the abilities of both transmission and fluorescence microscopy. Other developments in this period include the first holographic demonstration by Sadao Aoki and Seishi Kikuta in Japan, the first TXMs using zone plates by Schmahl et al., and Stony Brook's experiments in STXM.

The uses of synchrotron light sources brought new possibilities for X-ray microscopy in the 1980s. However, as new synchrotron-source-based microscopes were built in many groups, people realized that it was difficult to perform such experiments due to insufficient technological capabilities at that time, such as poor coherent illuminations, poor-quality x-ray optical elements, and user-unfriendly light sources.

Entering the 1990s, new instruments and new light sources greatly fueled the improvement of X-ray microscopy. Microscopy methods including tomography, cryo-, and cryo-tomography were successfully demonstrated. With rapid development, X-ray microscopy found new applications in soil science, geochemistry, polymer sciences, and magnetism. The hardware was also miniaturized, so that researchers could perform experiments in their own laboratories.

Extremely high-intensity sources of 9.25 keV X-rays for X-ray phase-contrast microscopy, from a focal spot about 10 μm × 10 μm, may be obtained with a non-synchrotron X-ray source that uses a focused electron beam and a liquid-metal anode. This was demonstrated in 2003 and in 2017 was used to image mouse brain at a voxel size of about one cubic micrometer (see below).

With the applications continuing to grow, X-ray microscopy has become a technique regularly used in environmental and soil sciences, geo- and cosmo-chemistry, polymer sciences, biology, magnetism, material sciences. With this increasing demand for X-ray microscopy in these fields, microscopes based on synchrotron, liquid-metal anode, and other laboratory light sources are being built around the world. X-ray optics and components are also being commercialized rapidly.

== Instrumentation ==
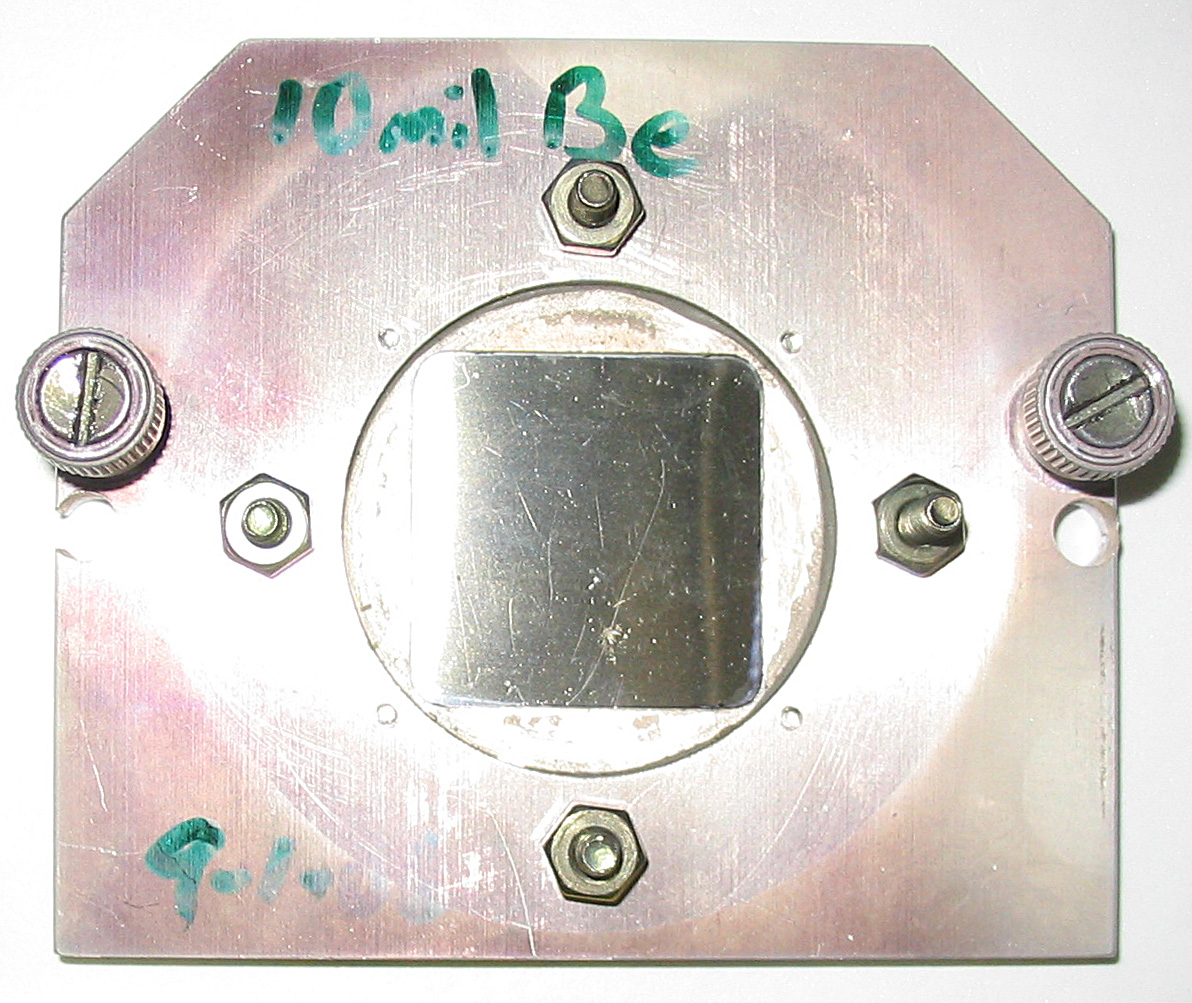
A square beryllium foil window mounted in a steel case to seal a vacuum chamber of an X-ray microscope. Beryllium, due to its low Z number is highly transparent to X-rays.

=== Synchrotron light sources ===
==== Advanced Light Source ====
The Advanced Light Source (ALS) in Berkeley, California, is home to XM-1, a full-field soft X-ray microscope operated by the Center for X-ray Optics and dedicated to various applications in modern nanoscience, such as nanomagnetic materials, environmental and materials sciences and biology. XM-1 uses an X-ray lens to focus X-rays on a CCD, in a manner similar to an optical microscope. XM-1 held the world record in spatial resolution with Fresnel zone plates down to 15 nm and is able to combine high spatial resolution with a sub-100ps time resolution to study e.g. ultrafast spin dynamics. In July 2012, a group at DESY claimed a record spatial resolution of 10 nm, by using the hard X-ray scanning microscope at PETRA III.

The ALS is also home to the world's first soft x-ray microscope designed for biological and biomedical research. This new instrument, XM-2 was designed and built by scientists from the National Center for X-ray Tomography. XM-2 is capable of producing 3-dimensional tomograms of cells.

=== Liquid-metal-anode X-ray source ===
Extremely high-intensity sources of 9.25 keV X-rays (gallium K-alpha line) for X-ray phase-contrast microscopy, from a focal spot about 10 um x 10 um, may be obtained with an X-ray source which uses a liquid metal galinstan anode. This was demonstrated in 2003. The metal flows from a nozzle downward at a high speed and the high intensity electron source is focused upon it. The rapid flow of metal carries current, but the physical flow prevents a great deal of anode heating (due to forced-convective heat removal), and the high boiling point of galinstan inhibits vaporization of the anode. The technique has been used to image mouse brain in three dimensions at a voxel size of about one cubic micrometer.

== Scanning transmission ==
Sources of soft X-rays suitable for microscopy, such as synchrotron radiation sources, have fairly low brightness of the required wavelengths, so an alternative method of image formation is scanning transmission soft X-ray microscopy. Here the X-rays are focused to a point, and the sample is mechanically scanned through the produced focal spot. At each point the transmitted X-rays are recorded using a detector such as a proportional counter or an avalanche photodiode. This type of scanning transmission X-ray microscope (STXM) was first developed by researchers at Stony Brook University and was employed at the National Synchrotron Light Source at Brookhaven National Laboratory.

== Resolution ==
The resolution of X-ray microscopy lies between that of the optical microscope and the electron microscope. It has an advantage over conventional electron microscopy is that it can view biological samples in their natural state. Electron microscopy is widely used to obtain images with nanometer to sub-Angstrom level resolution but the relatively thick living cell cannot be observed as the sample has to be chemically fixed, dehydrated, embedded in resin, then sliced ultra thin. However, it should be mentioned that cryo-electron microscopy allows the observation of biological specimens in their hydrated natural state, albeit embedded in water ice. Until now, resolutions of 30 nanometer are possible using the Fresnel zone plate lens which forms the image using the soft x-rays emitted from a synchrotron. Recently, the use of soft x-rays emitted from laser-produced plasmas rather than synchrotron radiation is becoming more popular.

== Analysis ==
Additionally, X-rays cause fluorescence in most materials, and these emissions can be analyzed to determine the chemical elements of an imaged object. Another use is to generate diffraction patterns, a process used in X-ray crystallography. By analyzing the internal reflections of a diffraction pattern (usually with a computer program), the three-dimensional structure of a crystal can be determined down to the placement of individual atoms within its molecules. X-ray microscopes are sometimes used for these analyses because the samples are too small to be analyzed in any other way.

== Biological applications ==
One early applications of X-ray microscopy in biology was contact imaging, pioneered by Goby in 1913. In this technique, soft x-rays irradiate a specimen and expose the x-ray sensitive emulsions beneath it. Then, magnified tomographic images of the emulsions, which correspond to the x-ray opacity maps of the specimen, are recorded using a light microscope or an electron microscope. A unique advantage that X-ray contact imaging offered over electron microscopy was the ability to image wet biological materials. Thus, it was used to study the micro and nanoscale structures of plants, insects, and human cells. However, several factors, including emulsion distortions, poor illumination conditions, and low resolutions of ways to examine the emulsions, limit the resolution of contacting imaging. Electron damage of the emulsions and diffraction effects can also result in artifacts in the final images.

X-ray microscopy has its unique advantages in terms of nanoscale resolution and high penetration ability, both of which are needed in biological studies. With the recent significant progress in instruments and focusing, the three classic forms of optics—diffractive, reflective, refractive optics—have all successfully expanded into the X-ray range and have been used to investigate the structures and dynamics at cellular and sub-cellular scales. In 2005, Shapiro et al. reported cellular imaging of yeasts at a 30 nm resolution using coherent soft X-ray diffraction microscopy. In 2008, X-ray imaging of an unstained virus was demonstrated. A year later, X-ray diffraction was further applied to visualize the three-dimensional structure of an unstained human chromosome. X-ray microscopy has thus shown its great ability to circumvent the diffractive limit of classic light microscopes; however, further enhancement of the resolution is limited by detector pixels, optical instruments, and source sizes.

A longstanding major concern of X-ray microscopy is radiation damage, as high energy X-rays produce strong radicals and trigger harmful reactions in wet specimens. As a result, biological samples are usually fixated or freeze-dried before being irradiated with high-power X-rays. Rapid cryo-treatments are also commonly used in order to preserve intact hydrated structures.

== See also ==
- X-ray computed tomography
- Electron microscope
- Neutron microscope
