= Lobster-eye optics =

X-ray optics design that mimics the structure of lobster eyes

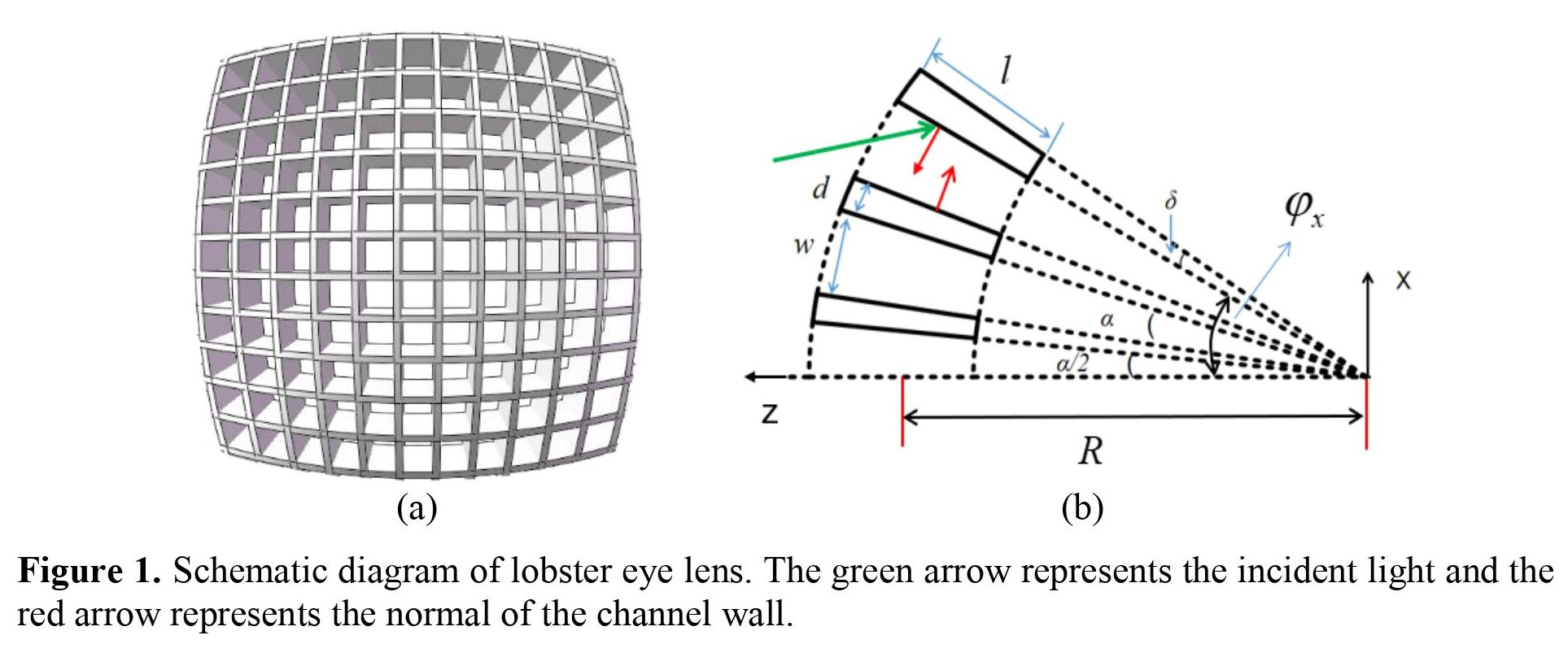
Schematic diagram of lobster-eye lens. The green arrow represents the incident light and the red arrows represent the normal of the channel wall.

Lobster-eye optics are a biomimetic design, based on the structure of the eyes of a lobster with an ultra-wide field of view, used in X-ray optics. This configuration allows X-ray light to enter from multiple angles, capturing more X-rays from a larger area than other X-ray telescopes. The idea was originally proposed for use in X-ray astronomy by Roger Angel in 1979, with a similar idea presented earlier by W. K. H. Schmidt in 1975. It was first used by NASA on a sub-orbital sounding rocket experiment in 2012. The Lobster Eye Imager for Astronomy, a Chinese technology demonstrator satellite, was launched in 2022. The Chinese Einstein Probe, launched in 2024, is the first major space telescope to use lobster-eye optics. Several other such space telescopes are currently under development or consideration.

== Description ==
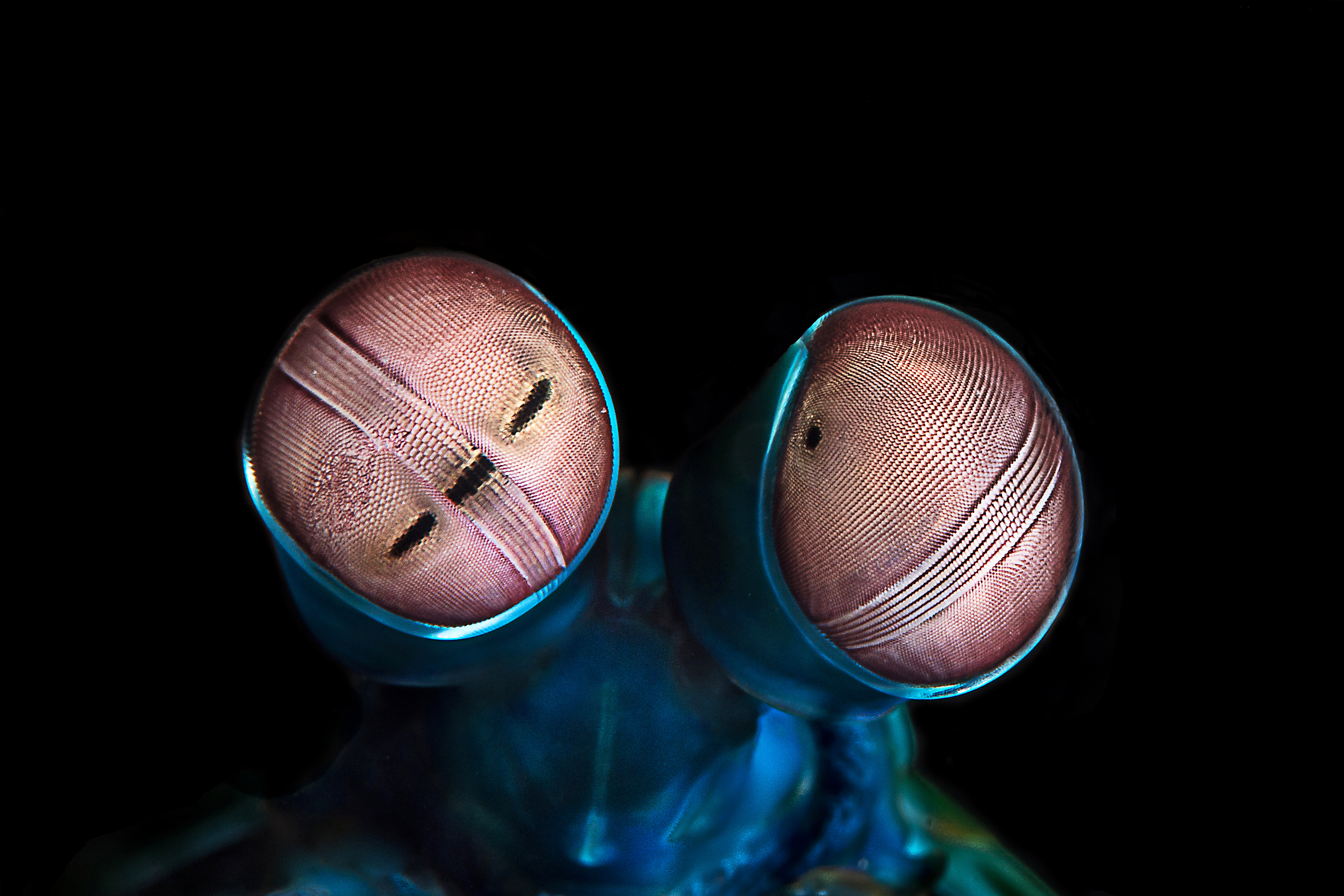
Close-up view of crustacean's (mantis shrimp's) eyes

While most animals have refractive eyes, lobsters and other crustaceans have reflective eyes. The eyes of a crustacean contain clusters of cells, each reflecting a small amount of light from a particular direction. Lobster-eye optics technology mimics this reflective structure. This arrangement allows the light from a wide viewing area to be focused into a single image. The optics are made of microchannel plates. X-ray light can enter small tubes within these plates from multiple angles, and is focused through grazing-incidence reflection that gives a wide field of view. That, in turn, makes it possible to locate and image transient astronomical events that could not have been predicted in advance.

The field of view (FoV) of a lobster-eye optic, which is the solid angle subtended by the optic plate to the curvature center, is limited only by the optic size for a given curvature radius. Since the micropore optics are spherically symmetric in essentially all directions, theoretically, an idealized lobster-eye optic is almost free from vignetting except near the edge of the FoV. Micropore imagers are created from several layers of lobster-eye optics that creates an approximation of Wolter type-I optical design.

== History ==
Only three geometries that use grazing incidence reflection of X-rays to produce X-ray images are known: the Wolter system, the Kirkpatrick-Baez system, and the lobster-eye geometry.

The lobster-eye X-ray optics design was first proposed in 1979 by Roger Angel. His design is based on Kirkpatrick-Baez optics, but requires pores with a square cross-section, and is referred to as the "Angel multi-channel lens". This design was inspired directly by the reflective properties of lobster eyes. Before Angel, an alternative design involving a one-dimensional arrangement consisting of a set of flat reflecting surfaces had been proposed by W. K. H. Schmidt in 1975, known as the "Schmidt focusing collimator objective". In 1989, physicists Keith Nugent and Stephen W. Wilkins collaborated to develop lobster-eye optics independently of Angel. Their key contribution was to open up an approach to manufacturing these devices using microchannel plate technology. This lobster-eye approach paved the way for X-ray telescopes with a 360-degree view of the sky.

In 1992, Philip E. Kaaret and Phillip Geissbuehler proposed a new method for creating lobster-eye optics with microchannel plates. Micropores required for lobster-eye optics are difficult to manufacture and have strict requirements. The pores must have widths between 0.01 and 0.5 mm and should have a length-to-width ratio of 20–200 (depends on the X-ray energy range); they need to be coated with a dense material for optimal X-ray reflection. The pore's inner walls must be flat and they should be organized in a dense array on a spherical surface with a radius of curvature of 2F, ensuring an open fraction greater than 50% and pore alignment accuracy between 0.1 and 5 arc minutes towards a common center.

Similar optics designs include honeycomb collimators (used in NEAR Shoemaker's XGRS detectors and MESSENGER's XRS) and silicon pore imagers (developed by ESA for its planned ATHENA mission).

== Uses ==
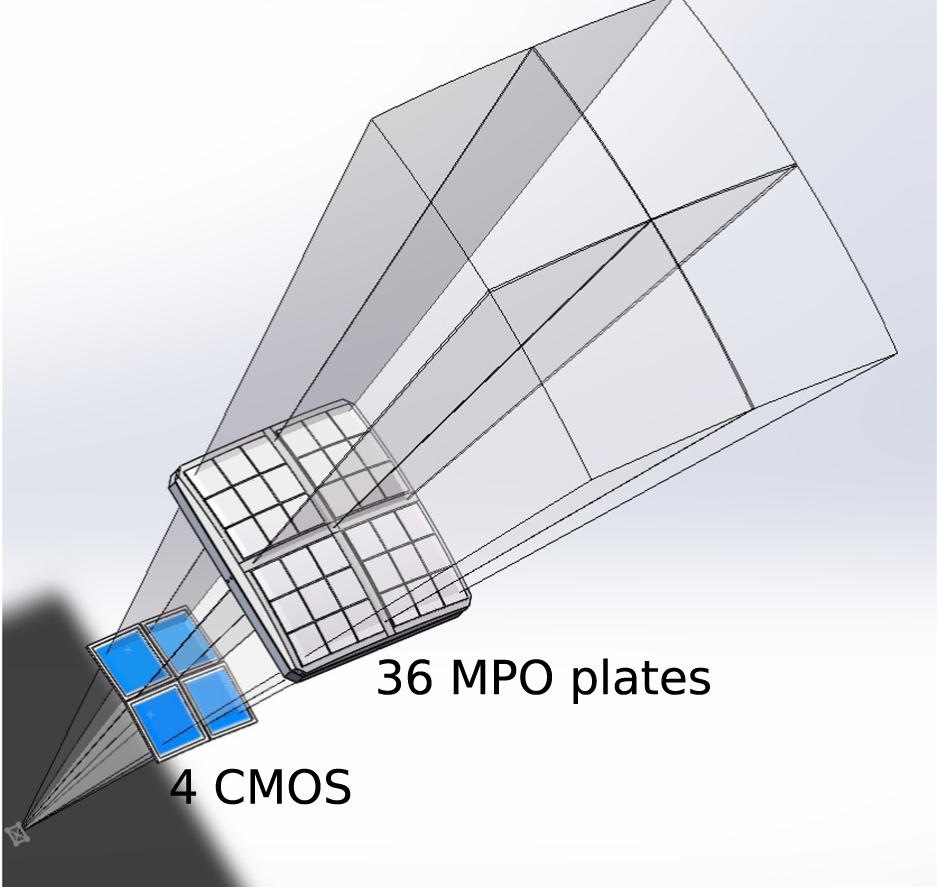
Configuration of the focusing mirror system, focal detector array, and FoV of LEIA. The mirror assembly is divided into four individual quadrants, each consisting of 3 × 3 MPO plates and associated with one of the four detectors.

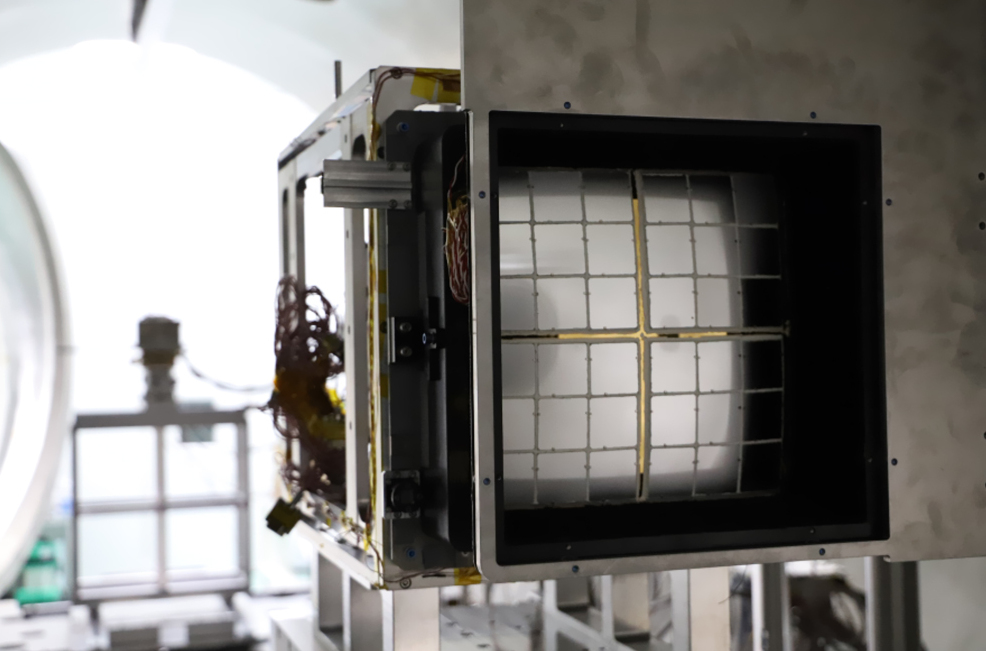
The LEIA instrument undergoing on-ground X-ray calibration before being assembled onto the SATech satellite.

NASA launched the first lobster-eye imager on a Black Brant IX sub-orbital sounding rocket in 2012. The STORM/DXL instrument (Sheath Transport Observer for the Redistribution of Mass/Diffuse X-ray emission from the Local galaxy) had micropore reflectors arranged in an array to form a Kirkpatrick-Baez system. BepiColombo, a joint ESA and JAXA Mercury mission launched in 2018, has a non-imaging collimator MIXS-C, with a microchannel geometry similar to the lobster-eye micropore design.

CNSA launched the Lobster-Eye X-ray Satellite in 2020, the first in-orbit lobster-eye telescope. In 2022, the Chinese Academy of Sciences built and launched the Lobster Eye Imager for Astronomy (LEIA), a wide-field X-ray imaging space telescope. It is a technology demonstrator mission that tests the sensor design for the Einstein Probe. LEIA has a sensor module that gives it a field of view of 340 square degrees. In August and September of 2022, LEIA conducted measurements to verify its functionality. A number of preselected sky regions and targets were observed, including the Galactic Center, the Magellanic Clouds, Sco X-1, Cas A, Cygnus Loop, and a few extragalactic sources. To eliminate interference from sunlight, the observations were obtained in Earth's shadow, starting 2 minutes after the satellite entered the shadow and ending 10 minutes before leaving it, resulting in an observational duration of ~23 minutes in each orbit. The CMOS detectors were operating in the event mode.

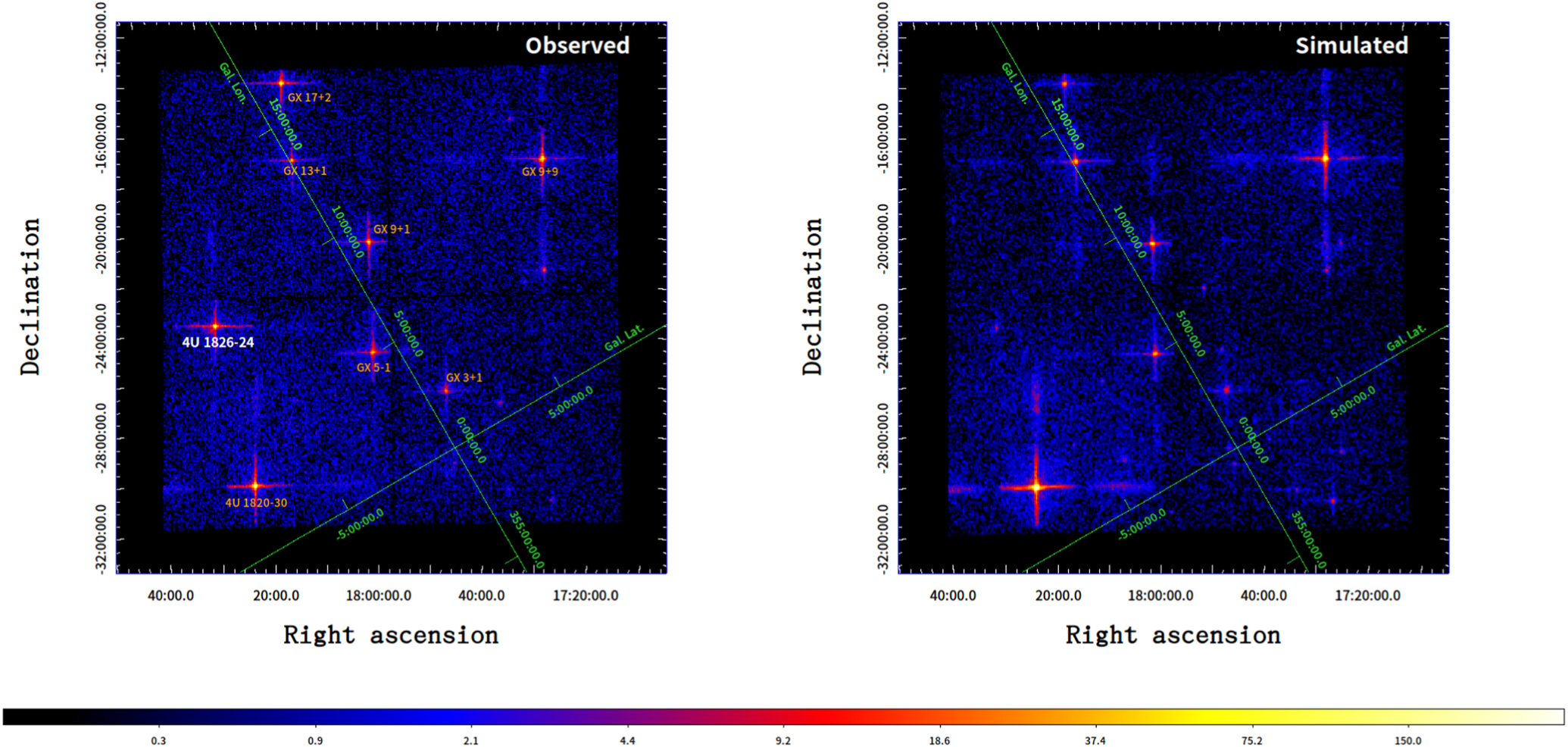
First-light X-ray image of the Galactic Center region obtained by LEIA in a one-shot observation of 798 s in 0.5–4 keV, covering a field of view of 18° × 18° (left). Colors represent counts per pixel.

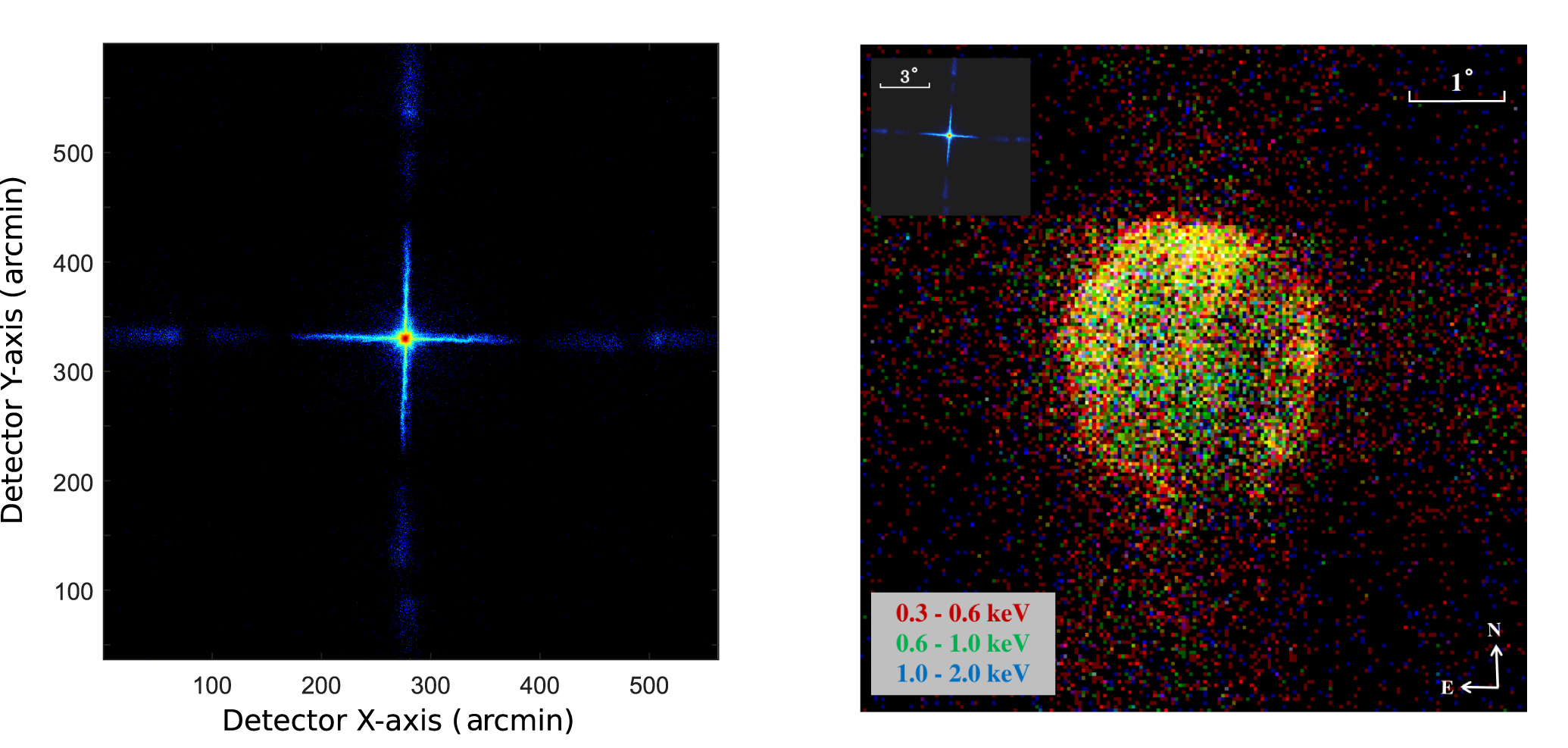
Left: X-ray image of Sco X-1 in 0.5–4 keV observed by LEIA with 673 s exposure. Right: X-ray image of the Cygnus Loop nebula with a diameter of ~2fdg5 obtained with a 604 s observation. Colors represent photon energies.

=== Current and future space telescopes ===
The Einstein Probe, a joint mission by the Chinese Academy of Sciences (CAS) in partnership with the European Space Agency (ESA) and the Max Planck Institute for Extraterrestrial Physics, was launched on 9 January 2024. It uses a 12-sensor module wide-field X-ray telescope for a 3600 square degree field of view, first tested by the Lobster Eye Imager for Astronomy mission.

The joint French-Chinese SVOM was launched on 22 June 2024.

NASA's Goddard Space Center proposed an instrument that uses the lobster-eye design for the ISS-TAO mission (Transient Astrophysics Observatory on the International Space Station), called the X-ray Wide-Field Imager. ISS-Lobster is a similar concept by ESA.

Several space telescopes that use lobster-eye optics are under construction. SMILE, a space telescope project by ESA and CAS, is planned to be launched in 2025. ESA's THESEUS is now under consideration.

=== Other uses ===
Lobster-eye optics can also be used for backscattering imaging for homeland security, detection of improvised explosive devices, nondestructive testing, and medical imaging.
