= Lobster Eye Imager for Astronomy =

X-ray imaging space telescope

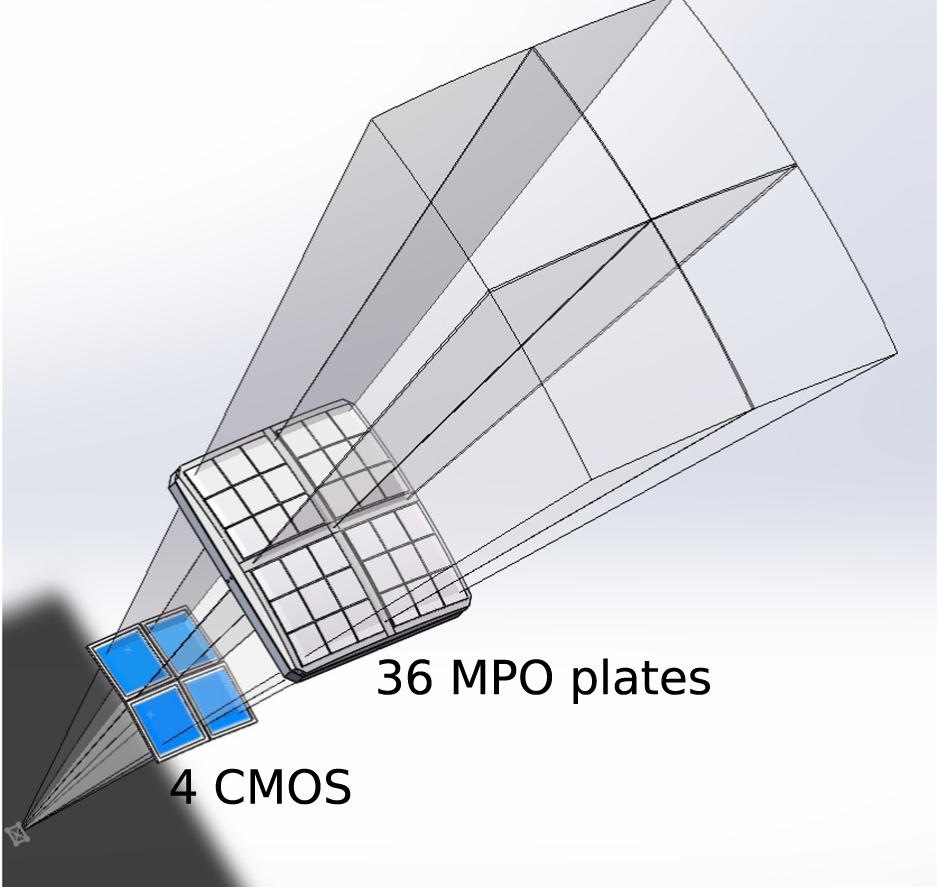
Configuration of the focusing mirror system, focal detector array, and FoV of LEIA. The mirror assembly is divided into four individual quadrants, each consisting of 3 × 3 MPO plates and associated with one of the four detectors. The overall FoV of the telescope module is 18fdg6 × 18fdg6.

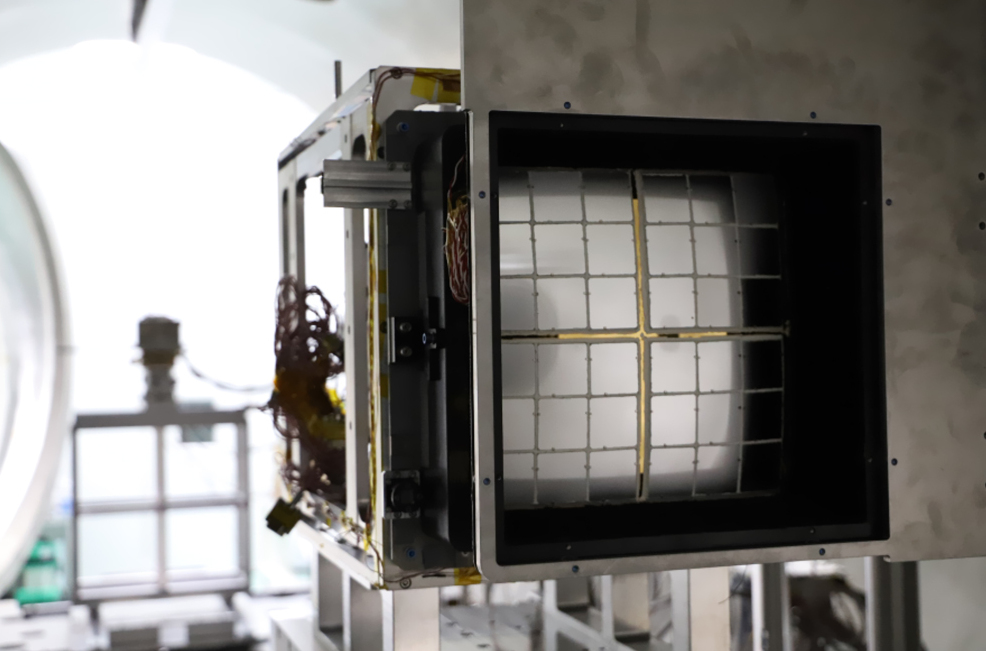
LEIA instrument undergoing on-ground X-ray calibration at IHEP before being assembled onto the SATech satellite.

Lobster Eye Imager for Astronomy (LEIA) (also known as EP-WXT-pathfinder) is a wide-field X-ray imaging space telescope built by Chinese Academy of Sciences (CAS). It was launched on July 27, 2022 onboard of SATech-01 satellite. It is designed for a lifetime of two years.

== Project conception and design ==
LEIA has a sensor module giving it a field of view of 340 square degrees. It is a preliminary mission testing the sensor design for the Einstein Probe which has a 12 sensor module Wide-field X-ray Telescope for a 3600 square degree field of view.

The sensor uses lobster-eye micropore optics; it is the first space telescope that uses such optics. In 2022 August and September, LEIA carried out a series of test observations for several days as part of its performance verification phase. A number of preselected sky regions and targets were observed, including the Galactic Center, the Magellanic Clouds, Sco X-1, Cas A, Cygnus Loop, and a few extragalactic sources. The observations were performed in Earth's shadow to eliminate the effects of the Sun, starting 2 minutes after the satellite entering the shadow and ending 10 minutes before leaving it, resulting in an observational duration of ~23 minutes in each orbit. The CMOS detectors were operating in the event mode.

Developed by the CAS's Innovation Academy for Microsatellites, SATech-01 is an exploration satellite aimed at test and demonstration of the new technologies of some 16 scientific experiments, ranging from astrophysics to solar physics, Earth observation to space environment monitoring. The satellite, with a designed lifetime of 2 yr, is in a Sun-synchronous near-Earth circular orbit with a period of 95 minutes.

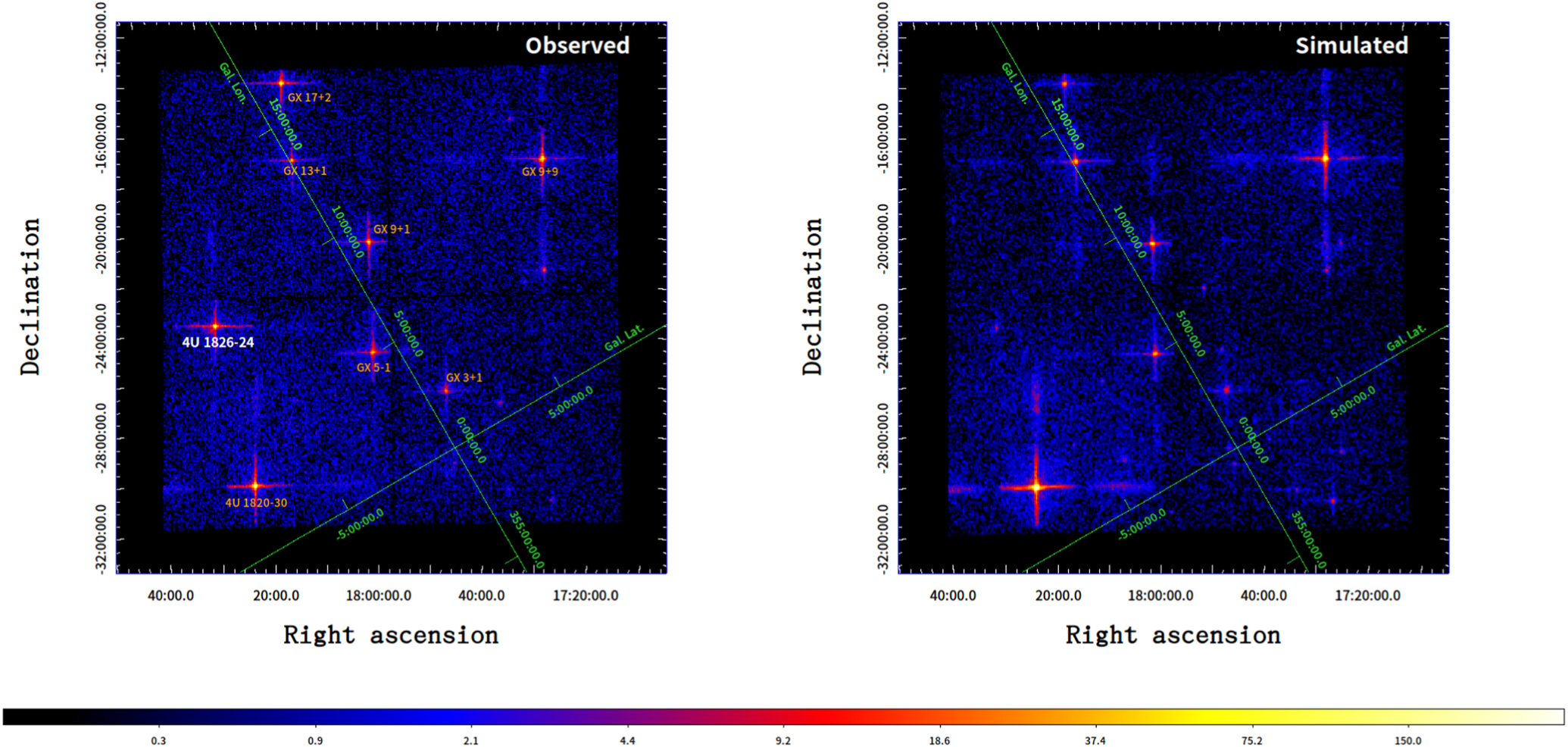
First-light X-ray image of the Galactic center region obtained by LEIA in a one-shot observation of 798 s in 0.5–4 keV, covering a field of view of 18fdg6 × 18fdg6 (left). Colors represent counts per pixel.

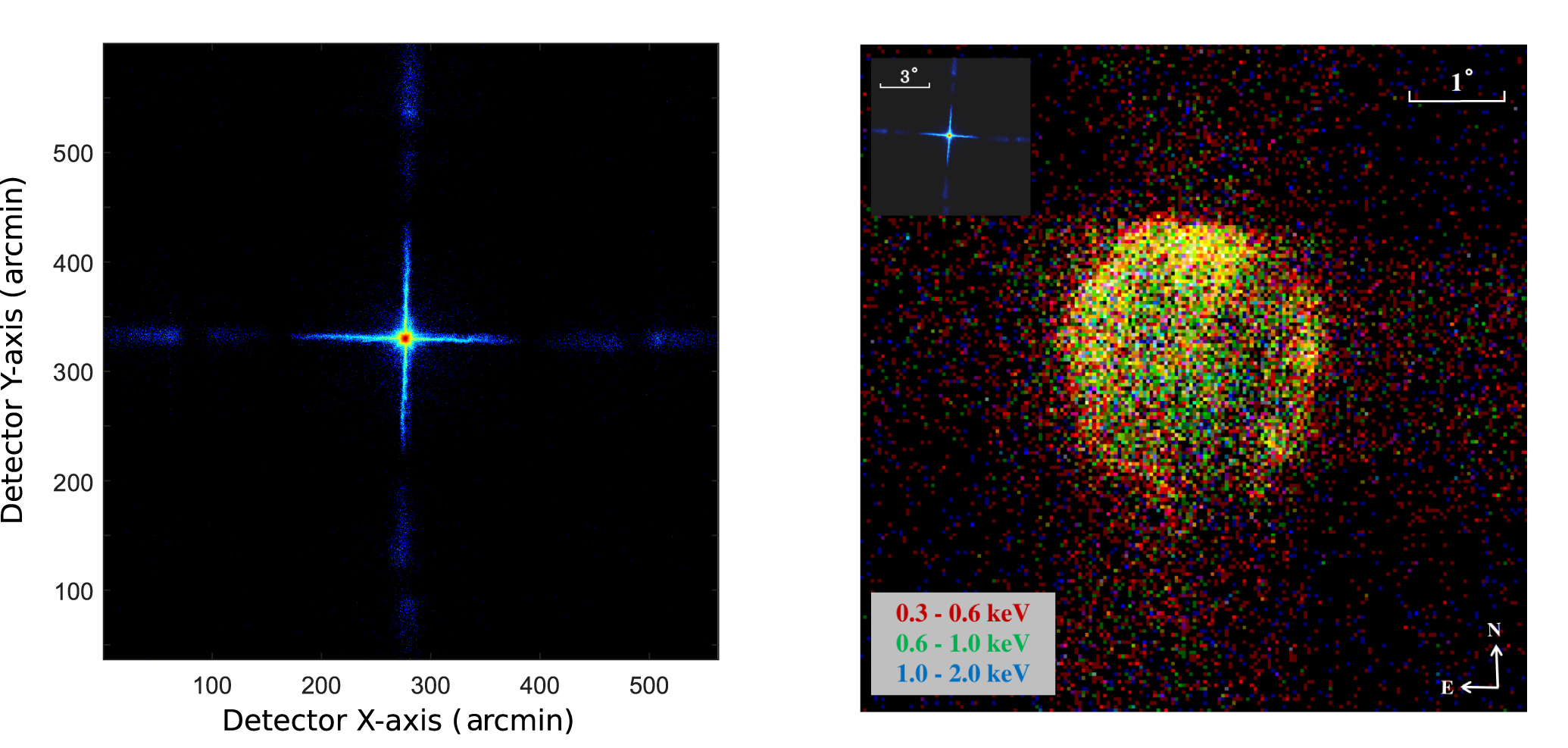
Left: X-ray image of Scorpius X-1 in 0.5–4 keV observed by LEIA with 673 s exposure. Right: X-ray image of the Cygnus Loop nebula with a diameter of ~2fdg5 obtained with a 604 s observation (colors represent photon energies).

== See also ==
- Space Variable Objects Monitor
- THESEUS
- Timeline of artificial satellites and space probes
- X-ray astronomy
- List of X-ray space telescopes
