= Henry N. Chapman =

British physicist

- Born: 1967 (age 58–59); Great Britain
- Education: University of Melbourne
- Known for: X-ray crystallography Coherent diffraction imaging
- Scientific career
- Workplaces: Lawrence Livermore National Laboratory; University of California Davis; National Synchrotron Light Source; Deutsches Elektronen-Synchrotron; University of Hamburg
- Doctoral advisor: Keith Nugent; Stephen W. Wilkins
- Other academic advisors: David Sayre

Henry N. Chapman FRS (born 1967) is a British physicist and the founding director of the Center for Free-Electron Laser Science at the German Electron Synchrotron (DESY). He has made numerous contributions to the field of x-ray coherent diffraction imaging and is a pioneer of the diffraction before destruction technique that allows to analyze biological samples with intense, ultrafast x-ray light, such as Photosystem II, a key macromolecule in photosynthesis.

He is married to the Slovenian physicist Saša Bajt.

== Education and career ==
Henry Chapman earned his Ph.D. from Melbourne University, in Australia. He then joined Stony Brook University in the United States, working in the group of Chris Jacobsen on the National Synchrotron Light Source in the field of coherent diffraction imaging and X-ray crystallography. In 1996 he joined Lawrence Livermore National Laboratory where he worked on extreme ultraviolet lithography. In 2007, he moved to DESY to become the Founding Director of CFEL Coherent Imaging Group.

== Awards and honors ==
- 2021 Gregori Aminoff Prize
- 2020 Fellow of the Royal Society
- 2017 Roentgen Medal 2017
- 2015 Gottfried Wilhelm Leibniz Prize
- 2010 Bjørn H. Wiik Prize
- 1993 Bragg medal

== See also ==
- Serial femtosecond crystallography
- X-ray crystallography
- Coherent diffraction imaging
- Free-electron laser
