= GRB 250314A =

Gamma-ray burst in the Virgo constellation

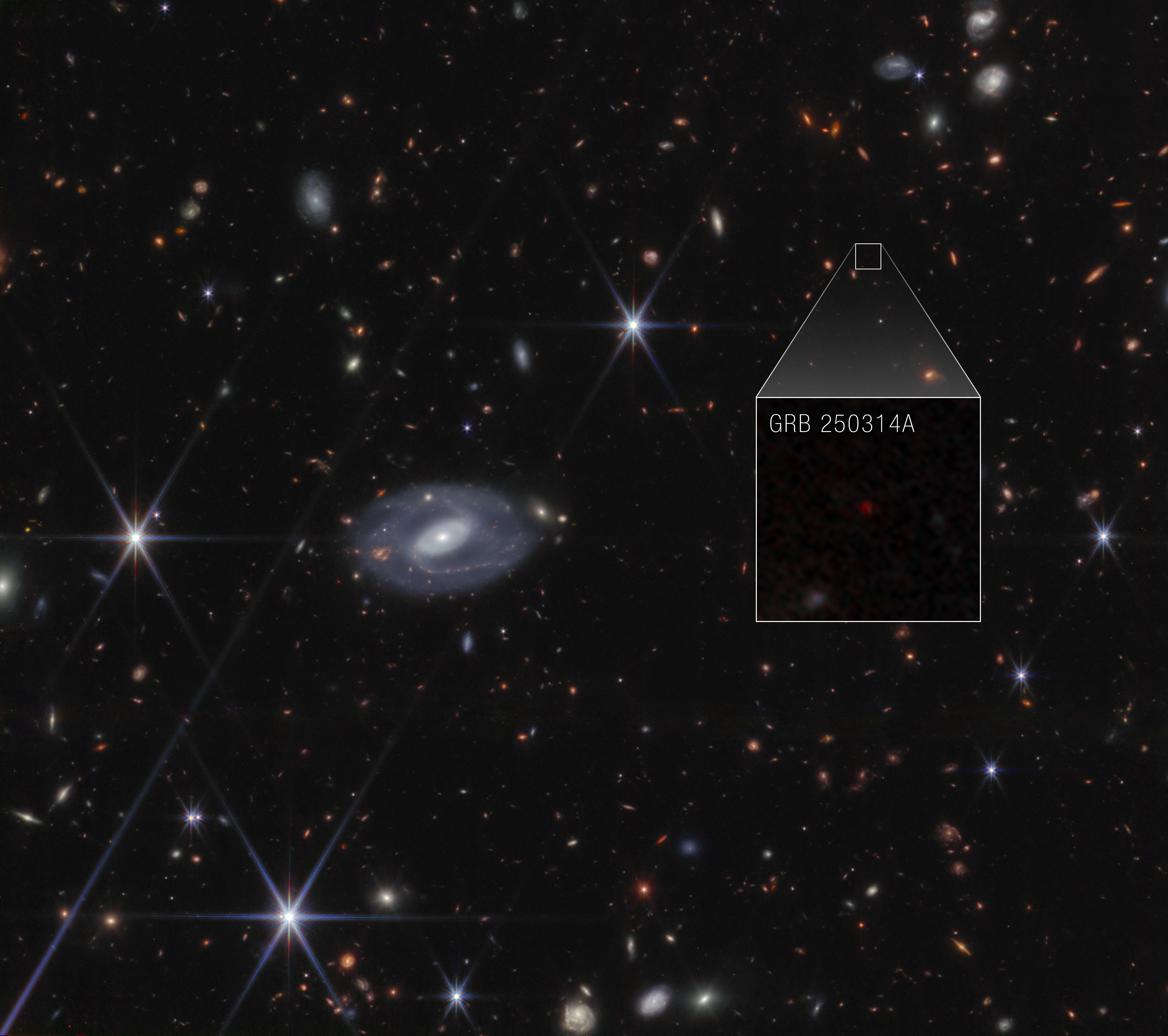
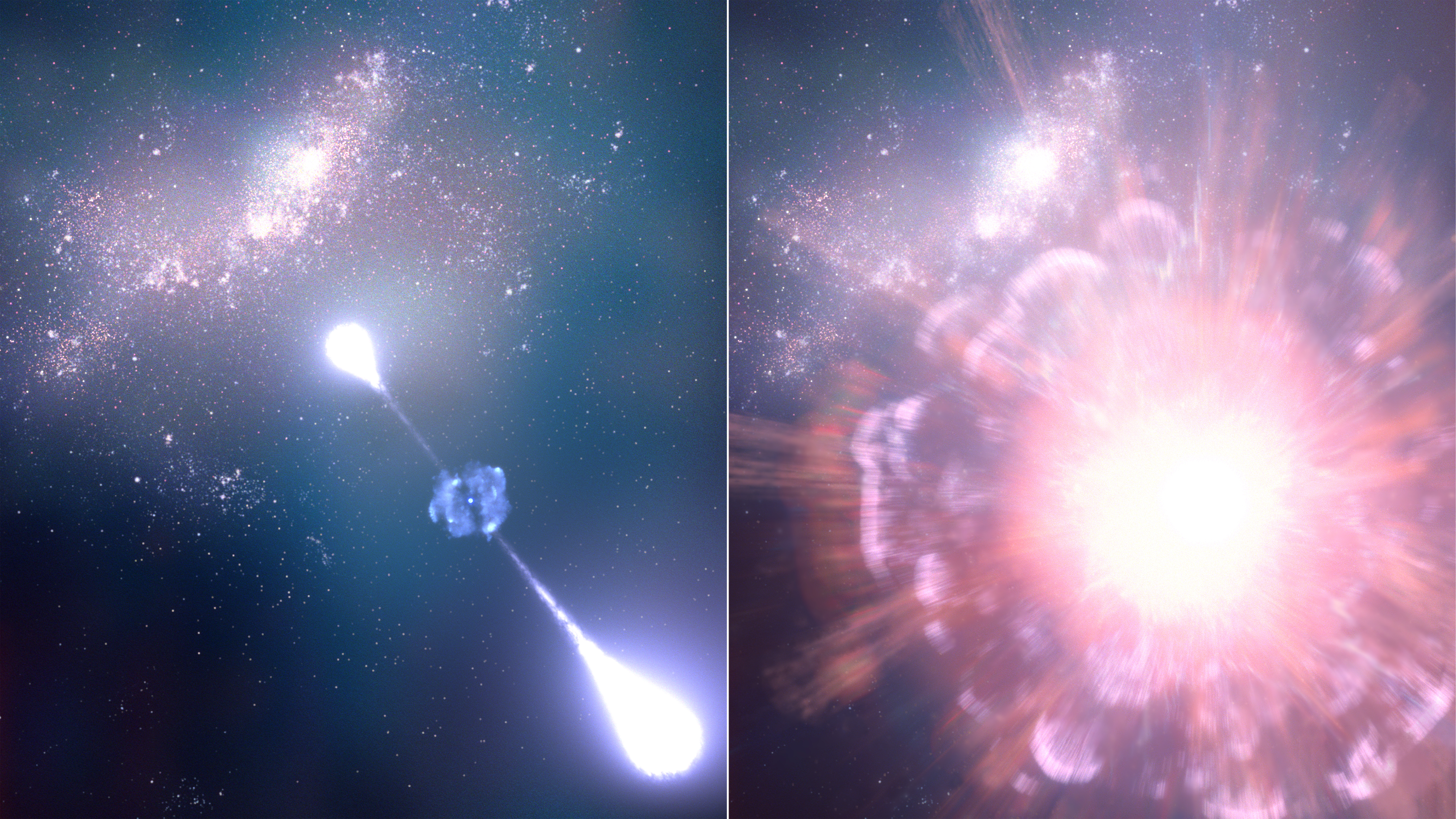
- On the top is JWST image of GRB 250314A while on the bottom is the Artistic Representation of GRB 250314A
- Event type: Supernova
- Type II
- Date: 14 March 2025, 12:56:42 UTC
- Instrument: Space Variable Objects Monitor
- Constellation: Virgo
- Right ascension: 13^{h} 25^{m} 12.16^{s}
- Declination: −05° 16′ 55.10″
- Epoch: J2000
- Redshift: 7.3

GRB 250314A is a long-duration gamma-ray burst (GRB) detected on 14 March 2025, at a redshift of z ≈ 7.3, corresponding to approximately 730 million years after the Big Bang. This event is associated with the core-collapse supernova of a massive star, marking the earliest confirmed supernova explosion observed to date and surpassing the previous record holder at z ≈ 4.3 (1.8 billion years post-Big Bang). GRB 250314A provides critical insights into massive star formation and death during the Epoch of Reionization, a period when the universe's neutral intergalactic medium was ionized by the first galaxies.

The burst was first detected by the Space Variable Objects Monitor (SVOM) satellite and followed up by multiple international observatories, including NASA's James Webb Space Telescope (JWST), which confirmed the supernova and imaged the host galaxy, a compact, star-forming system resembling those from the reionization era. The event's properties align with models of collapsars, where rapidly rotating massive stars (>20–30 M☉) collapse into black holes, producing relativistic jets.

== Discovery and observation ==
GRB 250314A was detected on 14 March 2025, at 12:56:42 UTC detected by French-Chinese SVOM satellite.

GRB 250314A offers direct evidence of massive star formation, explosions, and black hole seeding in the early universe, during reionization when the first galaxies ionized the neutral intergalactic medium. The supernova's similarity to modern events challenges predictions of more energetic explosions from metal-poor progenitors, implying collapsar-driven GRBs were producing black holes <1 billion years post-Big Bang.
