= 52 Cygni =

Binary star system in the constellation Cygnus

- Location of 52 Cygni (circled)

Observation data Epoch J2000 Equinox ICRS
- Constellation: Cygnus
- A
- Right ascension: 20^{h} 45^{m} 39.75304^{s}
- Declination: +30° 43′ 10.9756″
- Apparent magnitude (V): 4.22
- B
- Right ascension: 20^{h} 45^{m} 40.206^{s}
- Declination: +30° 43′ 12.96″
- Apparent magnitude (V): 11.06

Characteristics
- Evolutionary stage: red clump
- Spectral type: G9.5III
- U−B color index: +0.88
- B−V color index: +1.05

Astrometry
Radial velocity (R_{v})	–0.72 km/s
Proper motion (μ)	RA: –8.98 mas/yr Dec.: +24.11 mas/yr
Parallax (π)	16.22±0.19 mas
Distance	201 ± 2 ly (61.7 ± 0.7 pc)
Absolute magnitude (M_{V})	+0.27

Details
Mass	2.07 M_{☉}
Radius	13.81 R_{☉}
Luminosity	89 L_{☉}
Surface gravity (log g)	2.5 cgs
Temperature	4,677 K
Metallicity [Fe/H]	−0.24 dex
Rotational velocity (v sin i)	3.7 km/s
Age	2.27 Gyr

Other designations
- ADS 14259, BD+30 4167, WDS J20456+3043, CCDM J20457+3043
- A: HR 7942, HD 197912, HIP 102453, SAO 70467
- B: TYC 2687-2652-1

Database references
SIMBAD	A
- B

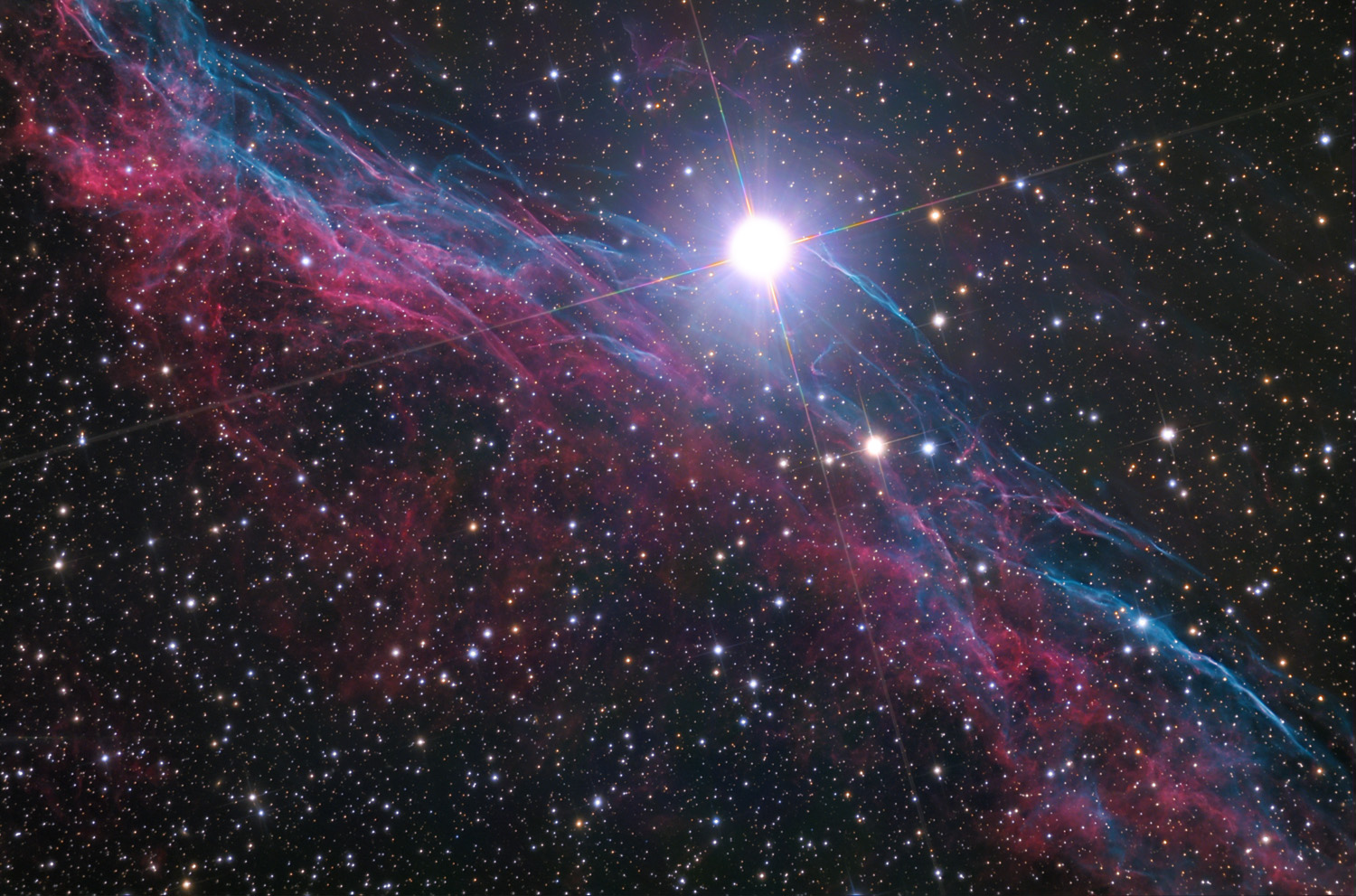
52 Cygni with NGC 6960, part of the Veil Nebula

52 Cygni is a giant star in the northern constellation of Cygnus with an apparent magnitude of 4.22. Based on its Hipparcos parallax, it is about 291 light-years (89 pc) away.

52 Cygni is a probable horizontal branch (red clump) star, fusing helium in its core, although there is a 25% chance that it is still on the red giant branch (RGB) and fusing hydrogen in a shell around an inert core. As a clump giant it would be 2.27 billion years old, but only 910 million years if 52 Cygni is an RGB star. It shines with a bolometric luminosity of about 90 L_{☉} at an effective temperature of 4,677 K. It has a radius of about 14 R_{☉}.

At an angular separation of 6.0″ from 52 Cygni is a faint magnitude 9.5 companion.

It was once designated k Cygni by John Flamsteed and was included in his Atlas Coelestis, but the designation is now dropped.
