= Veil Nebula =

Cloud of heated and ionized gas and dust in the constellation Cygnus

Diffuse nebula
- supernova remnant
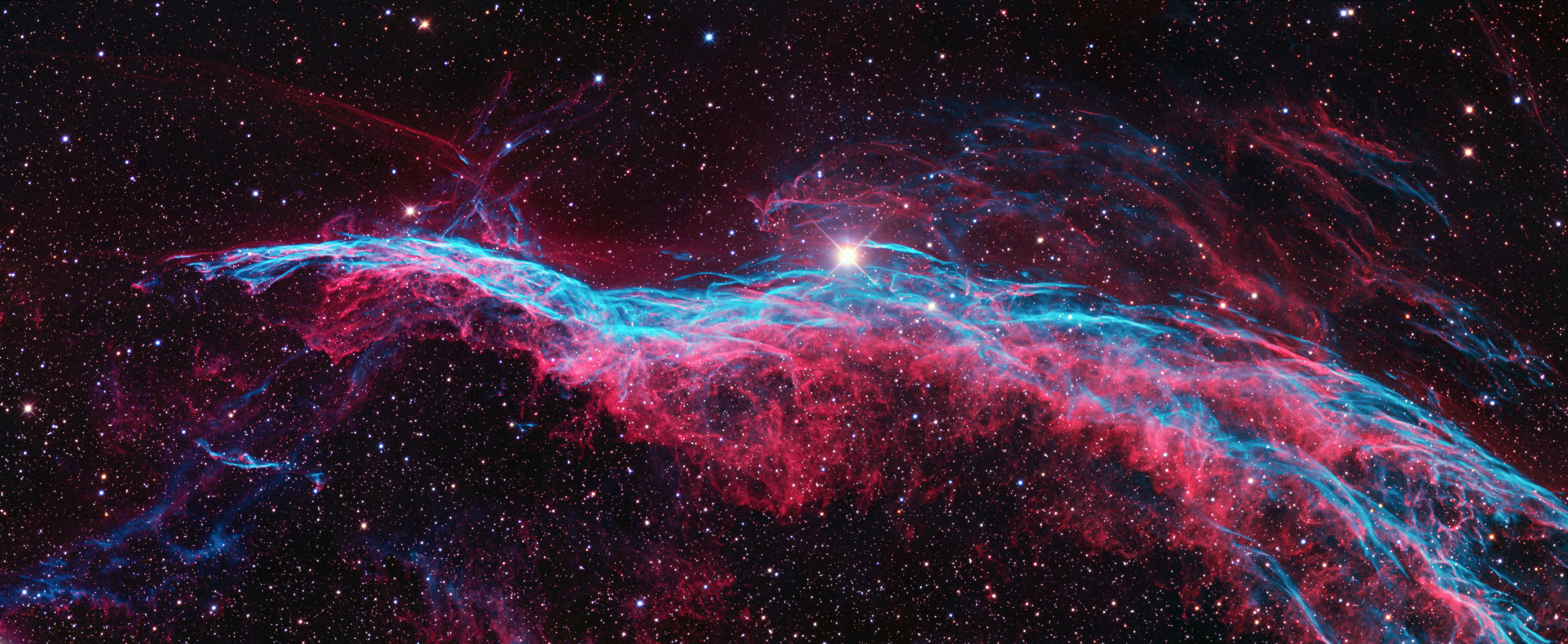
- Western Veil Nebula

Observation data: J2000.0 epoch
- Right ascension: 20^{h} 45^{m} 38.0^{s}
- Declination: +30° 42′ 30″
- Distance: 2,400 ly
- Apparent magnitude (V): 7.0
- Apparent dimensions (V): 3 degrees (diameter)
- Constellation: Cygnus

Physical characteristics
- Radius: 50-65 ly
- Designations: NGC 6960, 6992, 6995, 6974, and 6979, IC 1340, Cygnus Loop, Cirrus Nebula, Filamentary Nebula, Witch's Broom Nebula (NGC 6960), Caldwell 33/34

The Veil Nebula is a cloud of heated and ionized gas and dust in the constellation Cygnus.

It constitutes the brightest parts of the visible portion of the Cygnus Loop, a supernova remnant, many portions of which have acquired their own individual names and catalogue identifiers. The source supernova was a star 20 times more massive than the Sun which exploded between 10,000 and 20,000 years ago. At the time of the explosion, the supernova would have appeared brighter than Venus in the sky, and visible in the daytime. The remnants have since expanded to cover an area of the sky roughly 3 degrees in diameter (about 6 times the diameter, and 36 times the area, of the full Moon). While previous distance estimates have ranged from 1,200 to 5,800 light-years, a 2018 determination of 2,400 light-years is based on direct astrometric measurements. (The distance estimates affect also the estimates of size and age.)

The Hubble Space Telescope captured several images of the nebula. The analysis of the emissions from the nebula indicates the presence of oxygen, sulfur, and hydrogen. The Cygnus Loop is also a strong emitter of radio waves and x-rays.

== Components ==
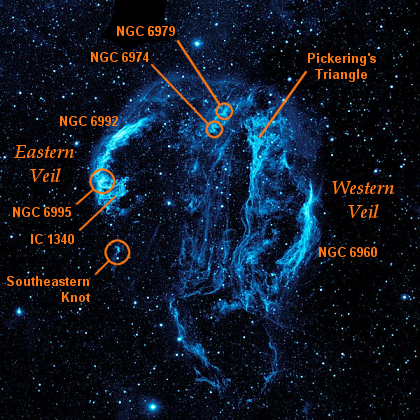
NASA photograph of the Cygnus Loop in ultraviolet light, with labels for well-known features. (25 November 2012)

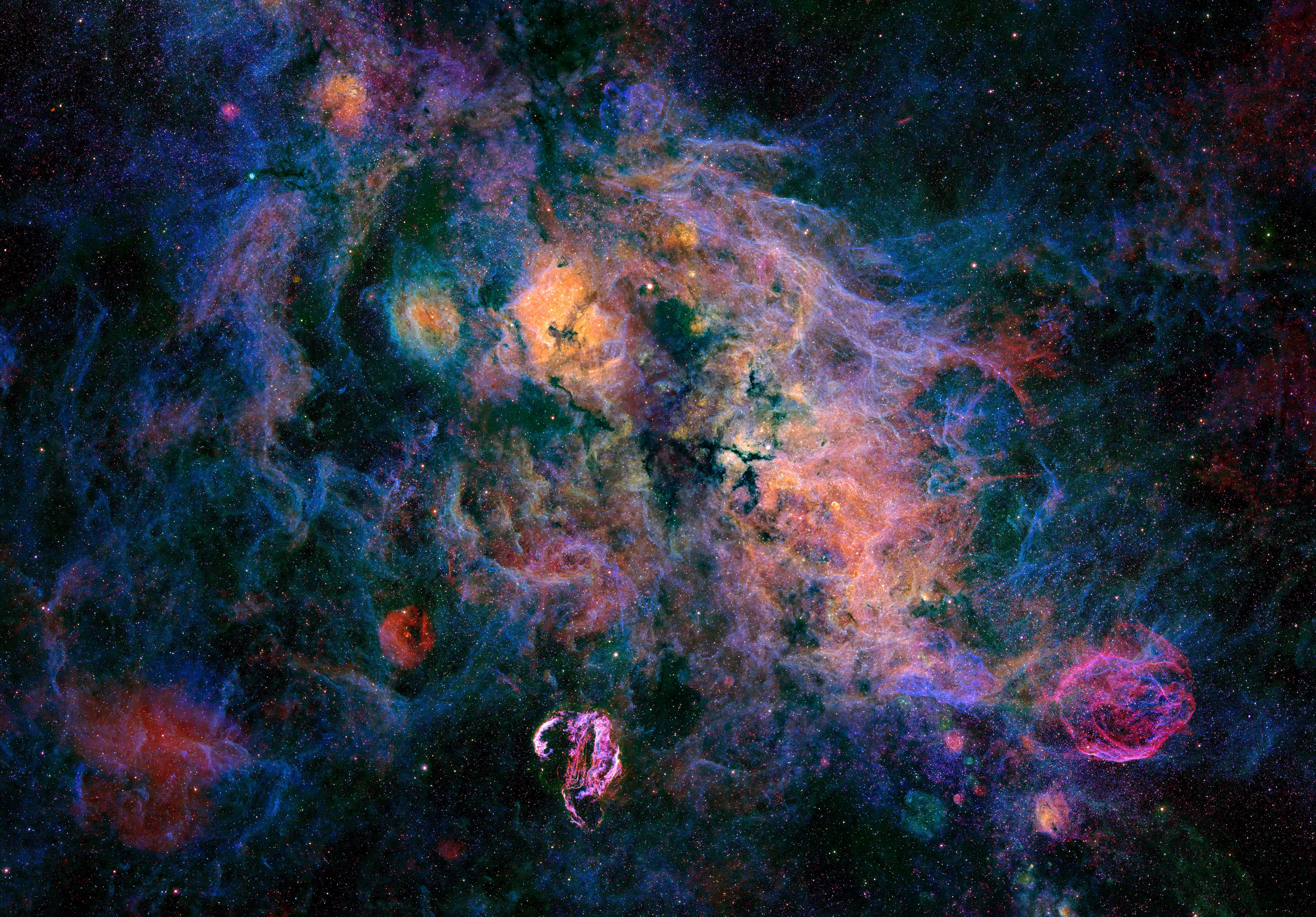
Similar view as above, showing the Cygnus Loop in optical emission lines as seen by the Northern Sky Narrowband Survey.

In modern usage, the names Veil Nebula, Cirrus Nebula, and Filamentary Nebula generally refer to the brightest part of the visible structure of the remnant, or even to the entire loop itself. The structure is so large that several NGC numbers were assigned to various arcs of the nebula. There are three main visual components:

- The Western Veil (also known as Caldwell 34), consisting of NGC 6960 (the "Witch's Broom", Lacework Nebula, "Filamentary Nebula") near the foreground star 52 Cygni;
- The Eastern Veil (also known as Caldwell 33), whose brightest area is NGC 6992, trailing off farther south into NGC 6995 (together with NGC 6992 also known as "Network Nebula") and IC 1340;
- Pickering's Triangle (or Pickering's Triangular Wisp), brightest at the north central edge of the loop, but visible in photographs continuing toward the central area of the loop.

NGC 6974 and NGC 6979 are luminous knots in a fainter patch of nebulosity on the northern rim between NGC 6992 and Pickering's Triangle.

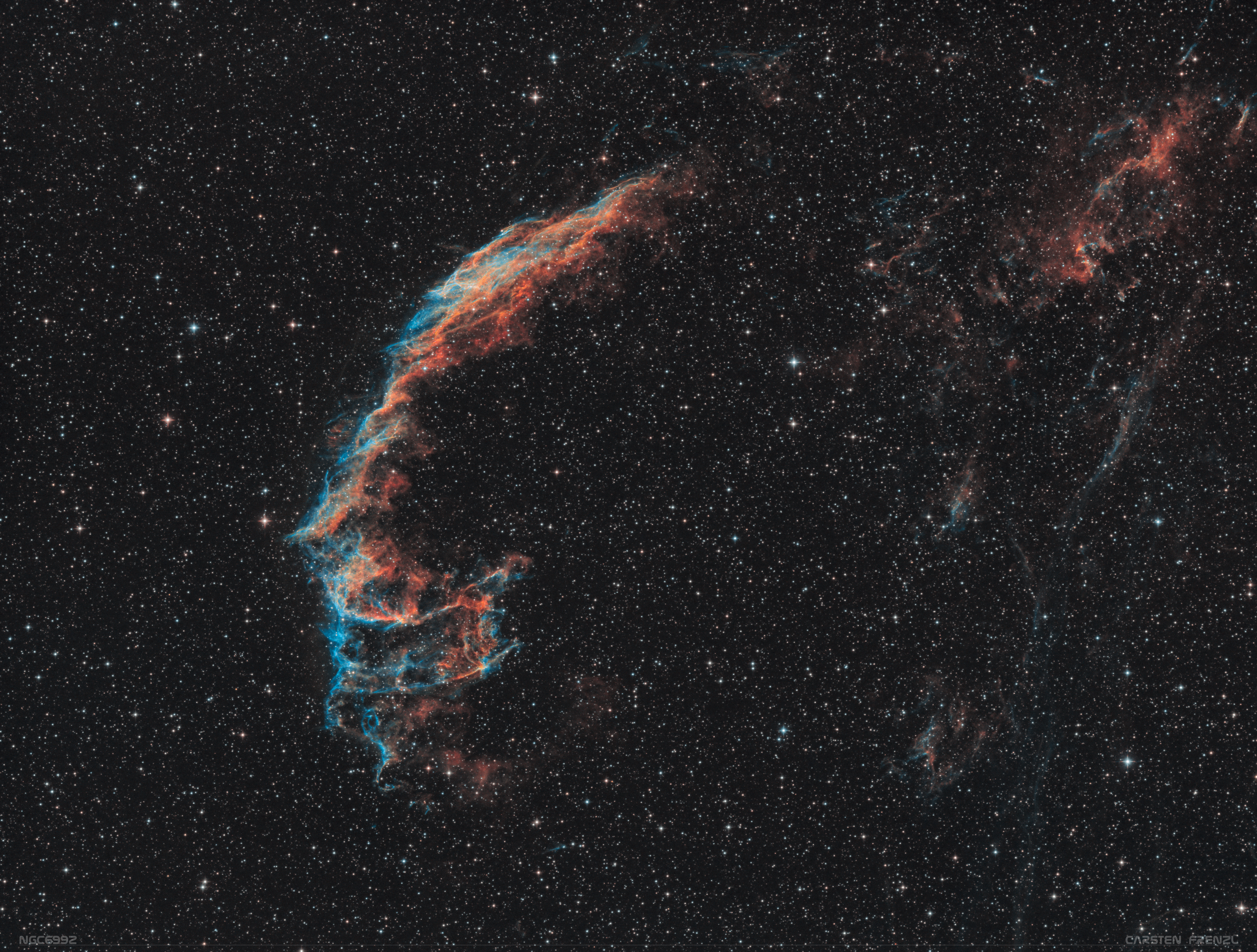
Eastern Veil Nebula

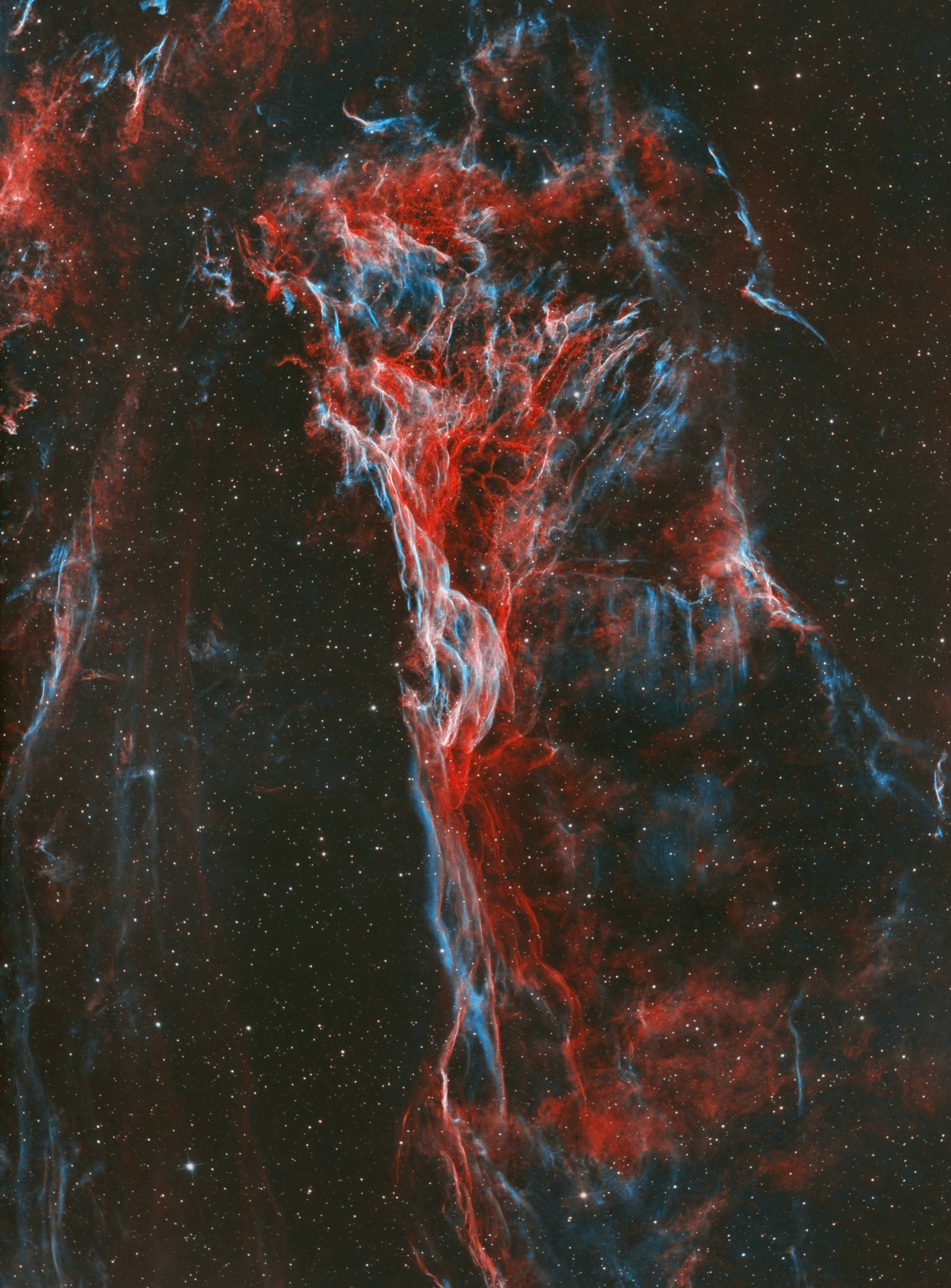
Pickering's Triangle

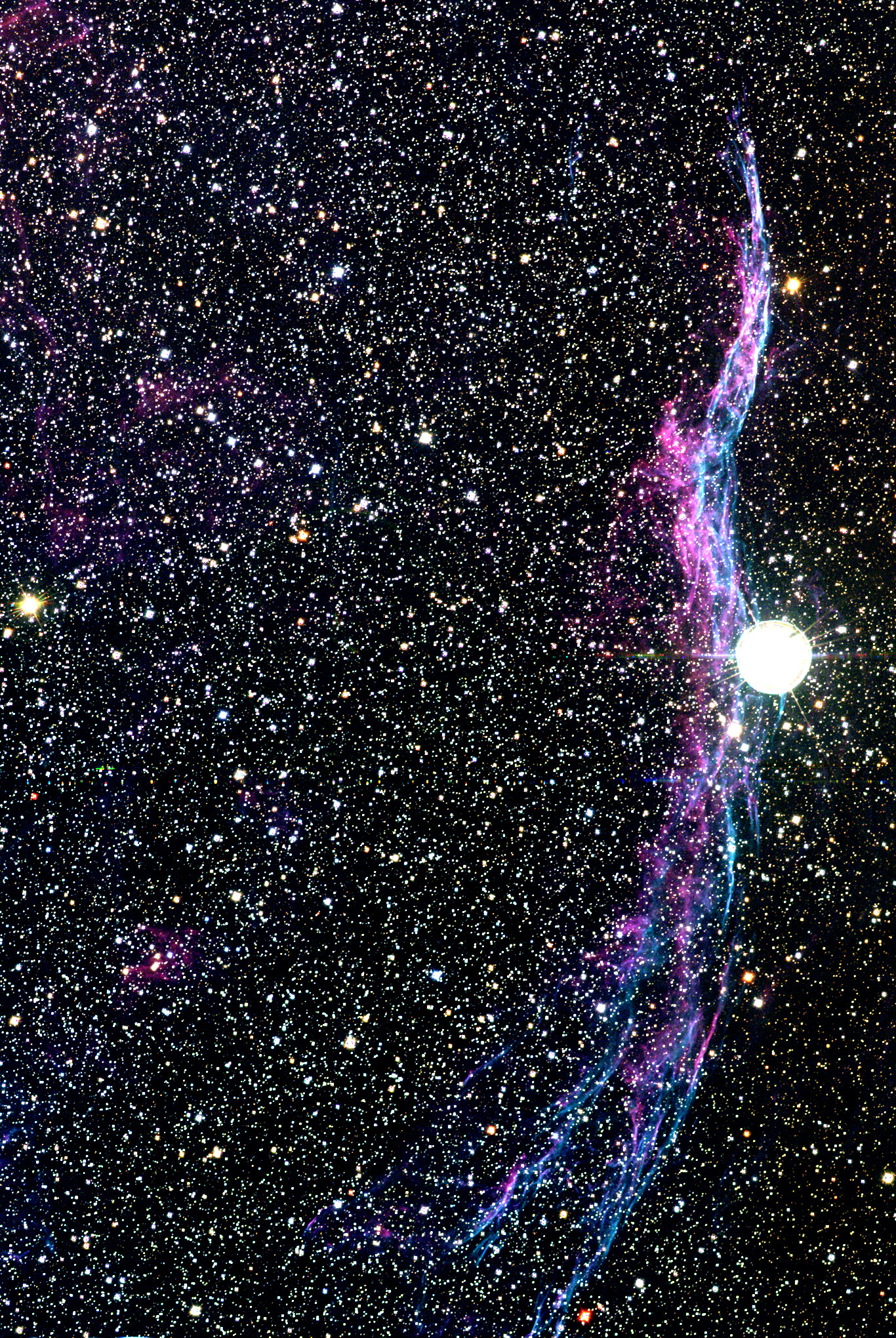
Western Veil Nebula

== Observation ==
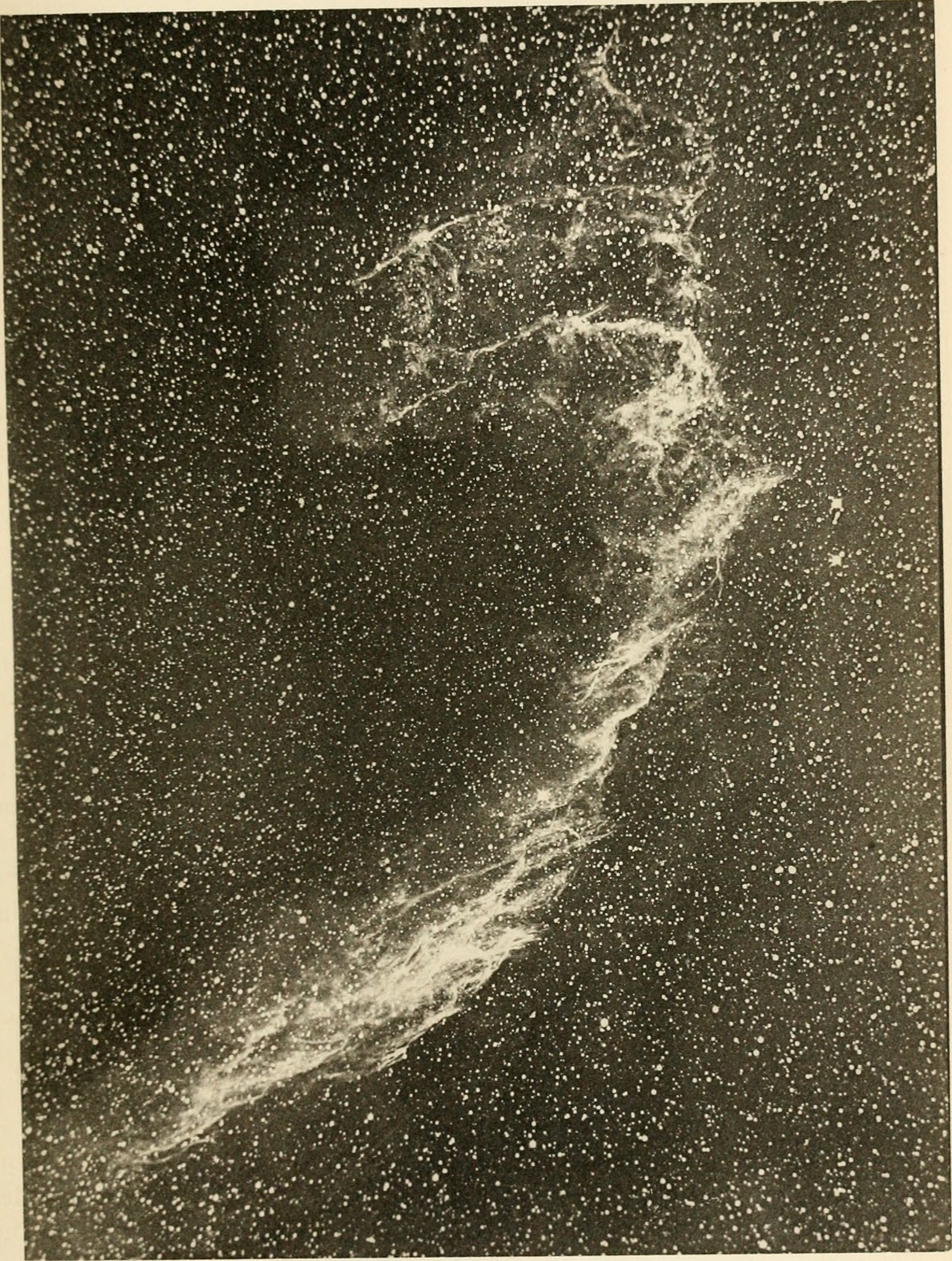
George Willis Ritchey image of what he called the Great Nebula in Cygnus (In modern times the Veil Nebula); taken with the two-foot reflecting telescope with 3 hours exposure at the Yerkes Observatory in 1901.

The nebula was discovered on 5 September 1784 by William Herschel. He described the western end of the nebula as "Extended; passes thro' 52 Cygni... near 2 degree in length", and described the eastern end as "Branching nebulosity ... The following part divides into several streams uniting again towards the south."

When finely resolved, some parts of the nebula appear to be rope-like filaments. The standard explanation is that the shock waves are so thin, less than one part in 50,000 of the radius, that the shell is visible only when viewed exactly edge-on, giving the shell the appearance of a filament. At the estimated distance of 2400 light-years, the nebula has a radius of 65 light-years (a diameter of 130 light-years). The thickness of each filament is 1/50,000th of the radius, or about 4 billion miles, roughly the distance from Earth to Pluto. Undulations in the surface of the shell lead to multiple filamentary images, which appear to be intertwined.

Even though the nebula has a relatively bright integrated magnitude of 7, it is spread over so large an area that the surface brightness is quite low, so the nebula is notorious among astronomers as being difficult to see. However, an observer can see the nebula clearly in a telescope using an O-III astronomical filter (isolating the wavelength of light from doubly ionized oxygen), as almost all light from this nebula is emitted at this wavelength. An 8-inch (200 mm) telescope equipped with an O-III filter shows the delicate lacework apparent in photographs. Smaller telescopes with an O-III filter can show the nebula as well, and some argue that it can be seen without any optical aid except an O-III filter held up to the eye.

The brighter segments of the nebula have the New General Catalogue designations NGC 6960, 6974, 6979, 6992, and 6995. The easiest segment to find is 6960, which runs behind 52 Cygni, a star that can be seen with the naked eye. NGC 6992 and 6995 are objects on the eastern side of the loop which are also relatively easy to see. NGC 6974 and NGC 6979 are visible as knots in an area of nebulosity along the northern rim. Pickering's Triangle is much fainter and has no NGC number (though 6979 is occasionally used to refer to it). It was discovered photographically in 1904 by Williamina Fleming (after the New General Catalogue was published), but credit went to Edward Charles Pickering, the director of her observatory, as was the custom of the day.

The Veil Nebula is expanding at a velocity of about 1.5 million kilometers per hour. Using images taken by the Hubble Space Telescope between 1997 and 2015, the expansion of the Veil Nebula has been directly observed.

== See also ==
- List of supernova remnants
- Cygnus Molecular Nebula Complex
