= Saša Bajt =

Slovenian scientist

Saša Bajt is a Slovenian scientist and a leading scientist at the Deutsches Elektronen-Synchrotron, where she develops multi-layer mirrors for X-ray applications such as Multilayer Laue Lenses (MLLs). She is a regular collaborator of the European XFEL.

== Education and career ==
Saša Bajt received her B. Sc. in Physics from the University of Ljubljana in Slovenia, before pursuing a PhD at the Max Planck Institute for Nuclear Physics and Heidelberg University in Germany. She then joined the University of Chicago as a research scientist, working on X-ray fluorescence microscopy and micro X-ray absorption spectroscopy at the National Synchrotron Light Source (NSLS). She joined Lawrence Livermore National Laboratory where she worked on the development of multilayer mirrors for Extreme ultraviolet lithography and X-ray Free-electron laser experiments. In 2008, she joined the Deutsches Elektronen Synchrotron (DESY) in Hamburg, Germany as the group leader for X-ray optics in extreme conditions. Since 2024 she is a leading scientist at DESY.

She is married to the British physicist Henry N. Chapman.

== Awards and honors ==
- 2023: Honored as Senior Member of SPIE
- 2022: DESY Innovation Award
- 2021: Ambassador of Science of the Republic of Slovenia
- 2019: Fellow of the Optical Society of America
- 2018: Microscopy Today Innovation Award
- 2018: Polish Synchrotron Radiation Society Award
- 1999: Hawley medal
