= Roger Angel =

British-born American astronomer

Roger Angel FRS
- Born: James Roger Prior Angel; February 7, 1941 (age 85); St Helens, Lancashire, England
- Education: Oxford (B.A., Ph.D.); California Institute of Technology (M.S.)
- Known for: Spin casting Multi-object spectroscopy Lobster-eye optics Space sunshade
- Scientific career
- Fields: Astrophysics, Optics
- Institutions: Columbia University; University of Arizona

James Roger Prior Angel (born February 7, 1941) is a British-American astrophysicist known for his contributions to astronomy and the design and fabrication of large optics for telescopes, solar power and other applications. He developed the spin casting and stressed lap polishing techniques used at the University of Arizona Richard F. Caris Mirror Lab to produce mirrors for some of the largest optical telescopes in the world. He is a Regents' Professor of Astronomy and Optical Sciences at the University of Arizona.

== Education ==
Angel graduated from St Peter's College, Oxford, with a BA, in 1963, from California Institute of Technology, with an MS, in 1966, and from the University of Oxford, with a D Phil, in 1967. While at Oxford's Clarendon Laboratory he built an early computer to allow for the first direct measurement an atom's quadrupole moment.

== Career and research ==
After receiving his doctorate, Angel moved to New York to take a position in the Columbia University Physics Department. He began research in astrophysics and astronomical instrumentation, building sounding rocket X-ray spectroscopes and ground-based telescope polarimeters for the observation of degenerate stars and other objects. In 1970, he was among the first to observe white dwarf magnetism.

Angel moved to Tucson in 1973 to join the University of Arizona Department of Astronomy. In 1977, he proposed using fused-silica optical fiber to separate and obtain the spectra of multiple sources of light from a single telescope image, the now widely-used technique of multi-object spectroscopy. In 1980, John Hill and Angel were the first to demonstrate the technique, measuring the redshifts of 26 individual galaxies based on a single exposure.

lobster-eye X-ray optics

In 1979, he proposed the lobster-eye optics design for X-ray astronomy. The design was first demonstrated on a NASA sounding rocket in 2013 and used for the Einstein Probe X-ray space telescope launched in 2024.

In 2006, Angel proposed a space sunshade composed of trillions of refractive disks in stable orbit between the Earth and the Sun where they would deflect enough solar radiation to counteract global warming. He estimated that the project could be developed over 25 years for less than 0.5% of world gross domestic product over that time.

== Awards and honors ==
Angel received a Sloan Research Fellowship for physics in 1970. In 1976 he was awarded the American Astonomical Society's Newton Lacy Pierce Prize. He received a MacArthur Fellowship in 1996. In 2010 he shared the Kavli Prize for Astrophysics with Jerry Nelson and Raymond Wilson for innovations in the field of telescope design.

Angel is an Honorary Fellow of St. Peter's College, Oxford and a fellow of the Royal Astronomical Society. In 1990 he was made a fellow of both the Royal Society and the American Academy of Arts and Sciences. In 2000 he became a member of the National Academy of Sciences.
