= Einstein Probe =

X-ray space telescope

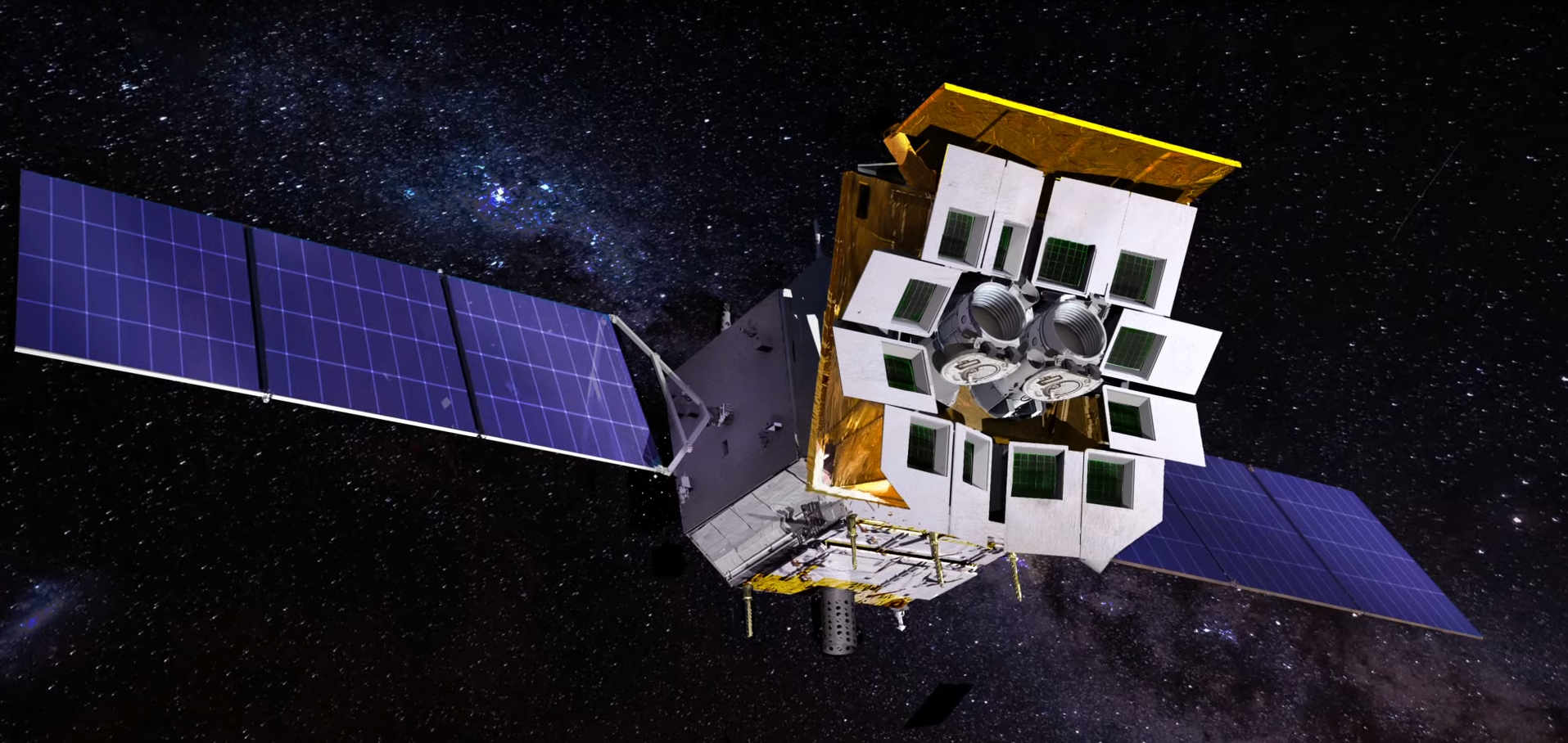
- Einstein Probe artist impression
- Names: Aiyinsitan Tanzhen
- Mission type: Space observatory
- Operator: CAS, ESA
- COSPAR ID: 2024-007A
- SATCAT no.: 58753
- Website: ep.bao.ac.cn/ep/
- Mission duration: 3 years (planned); Elapsed: 2 years, 6 months and 16 days

Spacecraft properties
- Spacecraft: Einstein Probe
- Bus: Phoenix-Eye-2
- Manufacturer: CAS
- Launch mass: 1,450 kg (3,200 lb)
- Dimensions: 3 × 3.4 m (9.8 × 11.2 ft)

Start of mission
- Launch date: 9 January 2024, 07:02 UTC
- Rocket: Long March 2C
- Launch site: Xichang LC-3
- Contractor: CASC

Orbital parameters
- Reference system: Geocentric orbit
- Regime: Low Earth orbit
- Perigee altitude: 581 km
- Apogee altitude: 596 km
- Inclination: 29°
- Period: 96 minutes

Instruments
- Wide-field X-ray Telescope (WXT); Follow-up X-ray Telescope (FXT)
- Einstein Probe Logo

The Einstein Probe (EP) is an X-ray space telescope mission by Chinese Academy of Sciences (CAS) in partnership with European Space Agency (ESA) and the Max Planck Institute for Extraterrestrial Physics (MPE) dedicated to time-domain high-energy astrophysics. The primary goals are "to discover high-energy transients and monitor variable objects". The telescope was launched by a Long March 2C rocket from the Xichang Satellite Launch Centre in China, on 9 January 2024, at 07:03 UTC.

== Scientific objectives ==
The primary science objectives are:

1. Identify inactive black holes to study how matter is accreted by detecting the transient events that take the form of X-ray flares;
2. Detect the electromagnetic counterpart of events triggering gravitational waves such as the merger of neutron stars which will be discovered by the next generation of gravitational wave detectors;
3. Carry out permanent monitoring of the entire sky to detect the various transient phenomena and carry out measurements of known variable X-ray sources.

== Instruments ==
Einstein Probe carries 2 scientific instruments: the Wide-field X-ray Telescope (WXT), and the Follow-up X-ray Telescope (FXT). Both telescopes utilize X-ray focusing optics.

- Wide-field X-ray Telescope (WXT): WXT has a new optics design, called "lobster-eye", that has wider field of view. "Lobster-eye" optics was first tested by the Lobster Eye Imager for Astronomy (LEIA) mission, launched in 2022. WXT consists of 12 lobster-eye optics sensor modules, together creating a very large instantaneous field-of-view of 3600 square degrees. The nominal detection bandpass of WXT is 0.5–4.0 keV. Each module weighs 17 kg and has an electrical power consumption of just under 13 W. With the peripherals, the entire telescope weighs 251 kg and has a power consumption of 315 W.
- Follow-up X-ray Telescope (FXT): FXT has optics adopted from eROSITA. "The mirror module consists of 54 nested Wolter mirrors with a focal length of 1600 mm and an effective area of greater than 300 cm^{2} at 1.5 keV."

The probe weights 1450 kg and is 3 × 3.4 metres.

== Launch ==
The Einstein Probe was launched on 9 January 2024, at 07:03 UTC by a Long March 2C rocket from the Xichang Satellite Launch Centre in China, and successfully placed in low Earth orbit at an altitude of 600 km and an inclination of 29°, giving an orbital period of 96 minutes.

== Findings ==
CAS reported that EP "performs as expected in the first month". The probe detected fast X-ray transient EP240315a, and bright X-ray flares EP240305a and EPW20240219aa.

On 15 March 2024, the Einstein Probe detected EP240315a, a soft X-ray burst from 12.5 billion light-years away, lasting over 17 minutes—the longest duration observed from such an ancient explosion. Linked to gamma-ray burst GRB 240315C, this event showed a six-minute delay between X-rays and gamma rays, never observed before. ESA notes that these findings challenge existing gamma-ray burst models.

The probe observed an X-ray outburst from EP J0052, a rare binary system of a Be star and a white dwarf (BeWD). After this discovery, several other space telescopes observed the system, including NASA's Swift and NICER, and ESA's XMM-Newton. XMM-Newton did not find the outburst 18 days after the EP's observations.

== See also ==
- Timeline of artificial satellites and space probes
- List of things named after Albert Einstein
- X-ray astronomy
- List of space telescopes#X-ray
