= Stephen W. Wilkins =

Australian scientist

- Born: 15 February 1946; Melbourne, Australia
- Died: March 25, 2013 (aged 67); Melbourne, Australia
- Education: University of Melbourne
- Known for: Phase-contrast X-ray imaging
- Awards: Walter Boas Medal (1997)
- Scientific career
- Fields: Physics
- Workplaces: CSIRO
- Doctoral advisor: John M. Cowley
- Doctoral students: Henry N. Chapman

Stephen William Wilkins (February 15, 1946 - March 25, 2013) was an Australian physicist known for his contributions to the field of Phase-contrast X-ray imaging.

== Biography ==
Wilkins' parents were originally from Brno, Czechoslovakia, but emigrated and came to Australia in 1939. Wilkins attended Preshil, The Margaret Lyttle Memorial School in Kew. Wilkins grew up in Melbourne and studied for a BSc in physics and mathematics between 1964 and 1967 at the University of Melbourne. He got his PhD in 1972 at the same university with a thesis titled "Correlations and Interactions in Binary Alloys". In 1975, he became a research scientist at the Commonwealth Scientific and Industrial Research Organisation (CSIRO). He advanced to eventually become Chief Research Scientist in 1998.

Wilkins unexpectedly died from a heart attack on March 25, 2013.

== Research ==
Wilkins is perhaps best known for his work on phase-contrast X-ray imaging (PCXI). His article on PCXI with laboratory, i.e. polychromatic, sources was published in Nature in 1996 and it is the most cited article in the X-ray phase-contrast research field with over 2000 citations.

Wilkins had an instrumental role in the conception and launch of the BigDiff beamline, BL20B, at the Photon Factory in Japan. The work to realize this beamline began in 1985 and the first experiments were conducted in 1992. This X-ray scattering beamline was primarily used for X-ray Diffraction (XRD) and X-ray absorption spectroscopy (XAS). The beamline was decommissioned on February 25, 2013.

== Awards ==
- 1997 - Walter Boas Medal from the Australian Institute of Physics. Shared with Keith Nugent.
- 2003 - Honorary Professor, Department of Physics, Monash University.
