= Keith Nugent =

Australian physicist

Keith Nugent AO FAA
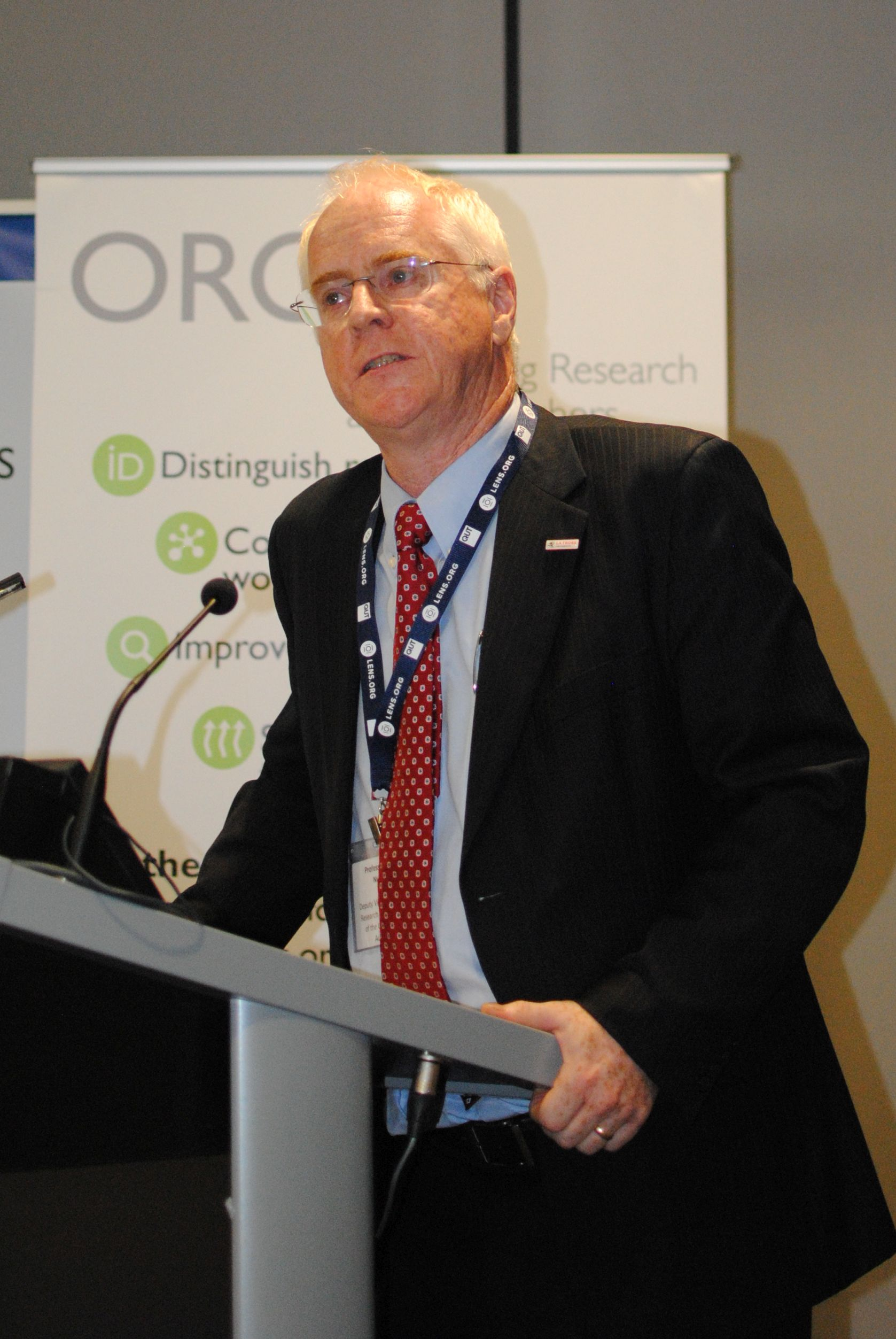
- Born: 28 June 1959 (age 67); Bath, England
- Education: Australian National University, University of Adelaide
- Known for: X-ray Optics; Near-field optics; Synchrotron Physics
- Spouse: Eroia Barone-Nugent
- Awards: 2004 Victoria Prize for Excellence in Science, Technology and Innovation; 2003 Centenary Medal; Two R&D 100 Award for Innovation (1988 and 2002); Elected as Fellow of the Australian Academy of Science (2001); Walter Boas Medal (1997) of the Australian Institute of Physics; Edgeworth David Medal (1992) of the Royal Society of New South Wales; Pawsey Medal from the Australian Academy of Science (1989)
- Scientific career
- Fields: Physicist

Keith Alexander Nugent AO FAA (born 28 June 1959 is an Australian physicist. He is Emeritus Professor of Physics at the Australian National University (ANU) in Canberra.

He was the Deputy Vice-Chancellor (Research and Innovation) of the Australian National University (ANU) from January 2019 to January 2024.

Prior to this he was Deputy Vice-Chancellor and Vice-President (Research) at La Trobe University, Victoria, and a Laureate Professor of Physics at the University of Melbourne, specialising in X-ray optics and optical physics.

He received a first-class honours degree from the University of Adelaide and his PhD from the ANU. Nugent is a Fellow of the Australian Academy of Science (FAA), and is known for his research in X-ray optics, X-ray free electron laser science, novel approaches to microscopy and X-ray phase contrast imaging.

== Early life and education ==
Nugent was born in Bath, England, where his father was a chocolate chemist for Fry & Sons. The family, including Nugent’s mother and his two brothers, moved to Australia when he was 11, when his father took up a role at Red Tulip (since taken over by Cadbury) in Melbourne. The family moved again to country NSW and Nugent completed his schooling at Batlow Central School.

He undertook a BSc in Physics and Theoretical Physics at ANU, Honours in Physics at University of Adelaide, then returned to the ANU to undertake a PhD in Laser Physics.

== Research and career ==
Nugent was appointed Professor at the University of Melbourne when he was 34, was elected to the Australian Academy of Science at 41 and was twice honoured as an Australian Research Council (ARC) Federation Fellow (2001 and 2006).

In 1989, Nugent collaborated with physicist Stephen W. Wilkins to develop a form of X-ray optics known as lobster-eye optics. Initially unknown to Wilkins and Nugent, the lobster-eye X-ray optics principle was first proposed for X-rays in the 1970s by Roger Angel. Nugent and Wilkins' key contribution was to open up an approach to manufacturing these devices using microchannel plate technology. The lobster-eye approach opened the way for X-ray telescopes with a 360 degree view of the sky. "The reason it's got such a high profile is that other X-ray telescopes see a tiny, tiny part of the sky. Although normal telescopes see a small part of the sky, X-ray telescopes see an even smaller part. The beauty (of the new telescope) is that it actually expands that field of view hundreds of times," Nugent said.

A lobster-eye X-ray satellite was successfully launched on 25 July 2020 from the Taiyuan Satellite Launch Center. The lobster-eye X-ray satellite will be the world's first in-orbit space exploration satellite equipped with such imaging technology.

Nugent became interested in how to measure optical phase without using interferometry. This has led to new approaches to radiography, electron and optical microscopy. He was the founding researcher of microscopy company IATIA, created to commercialise the work of himself and his two former PhD students, David Paganin and Anton Barty, in quantitative phase imaging (QPI). IATIA’s QPI technology was able to extract phase and wavefront information from light and other wave-like radiations using conventional imaging technology, such as standard digital cameras, without the need for special optical components. From 2005, Nugent was a Member of the Board of Directors and Chair of IATIA’s Audit Committee. The company traded for 10 years but failed in 2010 due to the 2008 financial crisis. IATIA was awarded the 2006 Australian Technology Showcase Patrons Award.

When Nugent's wife Dr Eroia Barone-Nugent developed and instigated the Growing Tall Poppies Program (2008) to increase and sustain girls in science beyond year 10 Nugent quickly included and this program in his scientific endeavors. With a focus on supporting young Australians in science his wife Dr Eroia Barone-Nugent was pivotal in showing how science centers of excellence could work with schools and curriculum to deliver on their outreach responsibilities Growing Tall Poppies Program (GTP) in 2008. The purpose of the student-scientist partnership program is to highlight the role of physics in solving real-world issues, and to help students become “tall poppies” in science.

Nugent was appointed part-time director of the Australian Synchrotron from 2011-12. He had previously served as a member of its national scientific advisory board and its board of directors.

From 2005-2012, Nugent was director of the ARC Centre of Excellence for Coherent X-ray Science, based at the University of Melbourne, where he drove the development of coherent X-ray diffraction methods for imaging biological structures using X-ray free-electron lasers.

He was Deputy Vice-Chancellor and Vice-President (research) at La Trobe University from January 2013 to December 2018.

Nugent has been a member of the ARC Expert Advisory Committee for Physics, Chemistry and Geosciences, and the international scientific advisory board of Elettra Sincotrone Trieste, the National Synchrotron Radiation Research Centre in Taiwan, and the European X-ray Free Electron Laser based in Hamburg. He was a chief investigator for the ARC Centre for Advanced Molecular Imaging.

He is also a board member at National Computational Infrastructure, the Advisory Committee on Policy Matters, Australian Academy of Science and the National Centre for Indigenous Genomics.

== ANU Deputy Vice-Chancellor (Research and Innovation) ==
Nugent was appointed Deputy Vice-Chancellor (Research and Innovation) of the Australian National University in 2019 and remained in the role until January 2024. ANU provost, Professor Mike Calford, said, "We sought to fill this critical role with a person who could continue to build the profile of ANU as a world-leading institution for research and development and one who understands the complex systems that support successful research".

== Commercial connections ==
Nugent is the non-executive director of Significant Early Venture Capital and WearOptimo. He is also the alternate director for VC at ANU Connect Ventures, and director at ANU Enterprise.

== Personal life ==
Nugent met his wife Dr Eroia Barone-Nugent at the Australian National University in 1981. The couple have three grown-up children: two sons who live in the USA, and one daughter who lives in Australia.

== Awards and honours ==
- 2025 Appointed Officer of the Order of Australia in the Australia Day Honours
- 2016 Lloyd Rees Lecture, Australian Academy of Science.
- 2011 Elected Fellow of the American Physical Society.
- 2009 Victorian State Impact Grant, Schools First Award, with Dr Eroia Barone-Nugent, for the Growing Tall Poppies program.
- 2004 Victoria Prize for pioneering work with quantitative phase imaging.
- 2003 Centenary Medal by the Federal Government for outstanding contributions to science.
- 2002 R&D 100 Award for the development of quantitative phase microscopy.
- 2000 Elected a Fellow of the Australian Academy of Science in 2000.
- 1997 The Walter Boas Medal (1997) of the Australian Institute of Physics, shared with Dr Stephen W. Wilkins.
- 1992 The Edgeworth David Medal of the Royal Society of New South Wales, shared with Peter James Goadsby.
- 1989 Pawsey Medal of the Australian Academy of Science.
- 1988 R&D 100 Award for the development of the penumbral neutron imaging camera.
