= Cygnus Loop =

Supernova remnant in the constellation of Cygnus

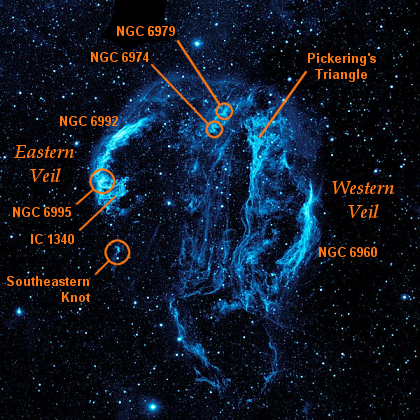
This GALEX image of the Cygnus Loop nebula could not have been taken from the surface of the Earth because the ozone layer blocks the ultra-violet radiation emitted by the nebula.

The Cygnus Loop (radio source W78, or Sharpless 103) is a large supernova remnant (SNR) in the constellation Cygnus, an emission nebula measuring nearly 3° across. Some arcs of the loop, known collectively as the Veil Nebula or Cirrus Nebula, emit in the visible electromagnetic range. Radio, infrared, and X-ray images reveal the complete loop.

== Visual components: the Veil Nebula ==
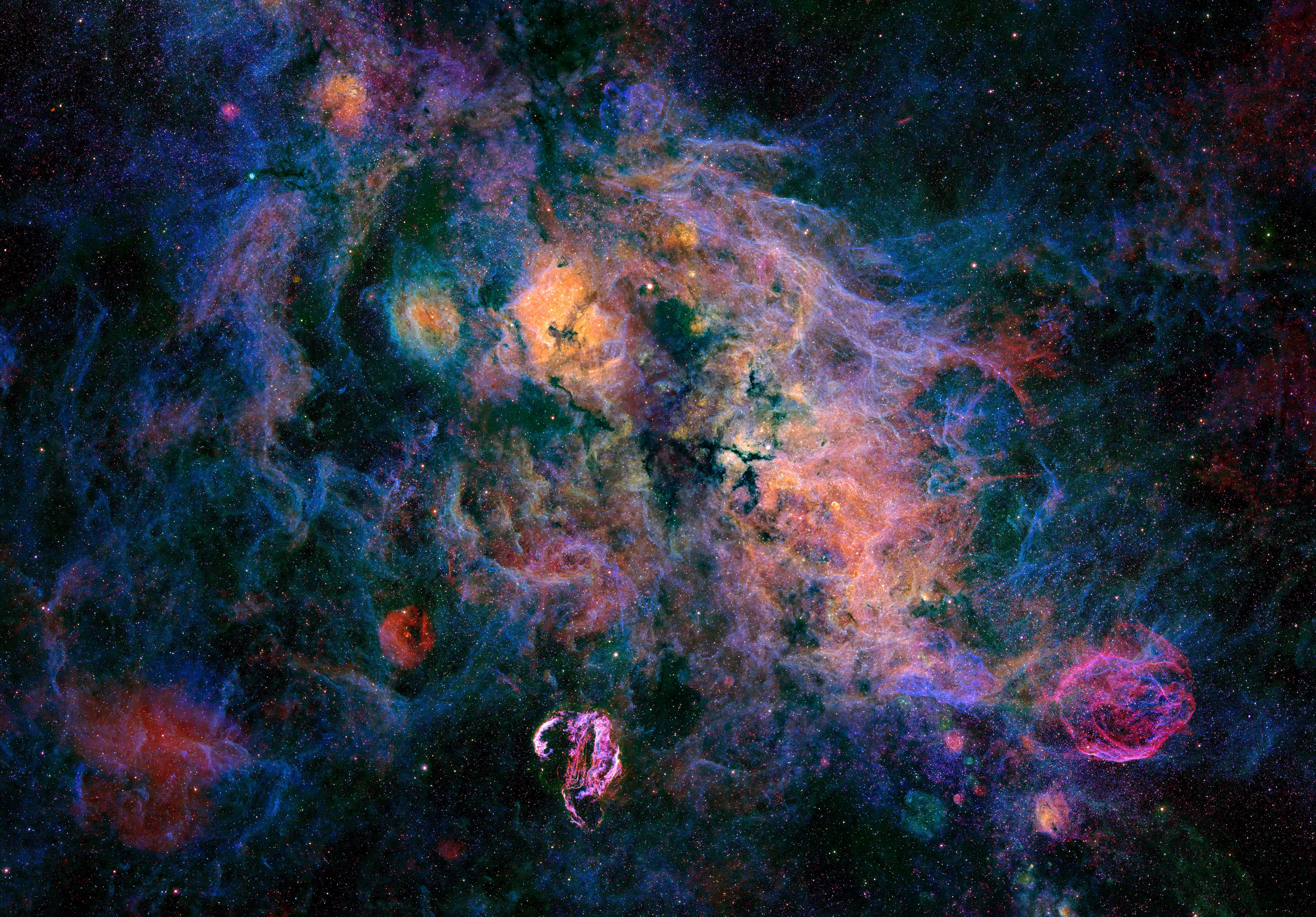
Similar view as above, showing the Cygnus Loop in optical emission lines as seen by the Northern Sky Narrowband Survey.

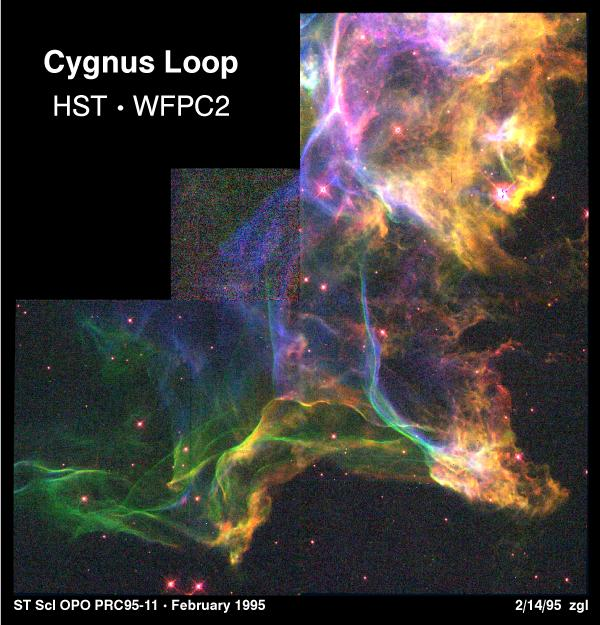

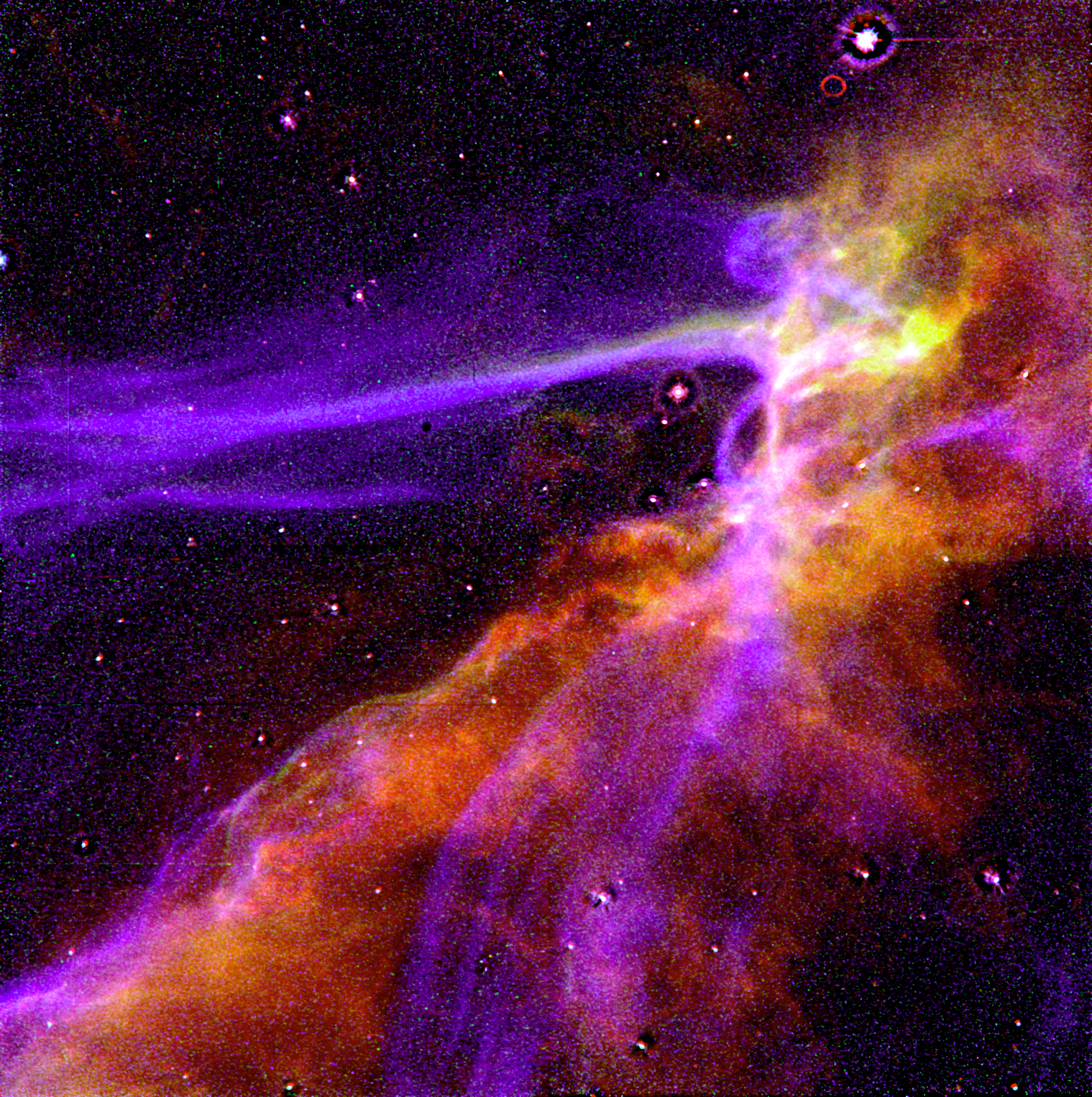

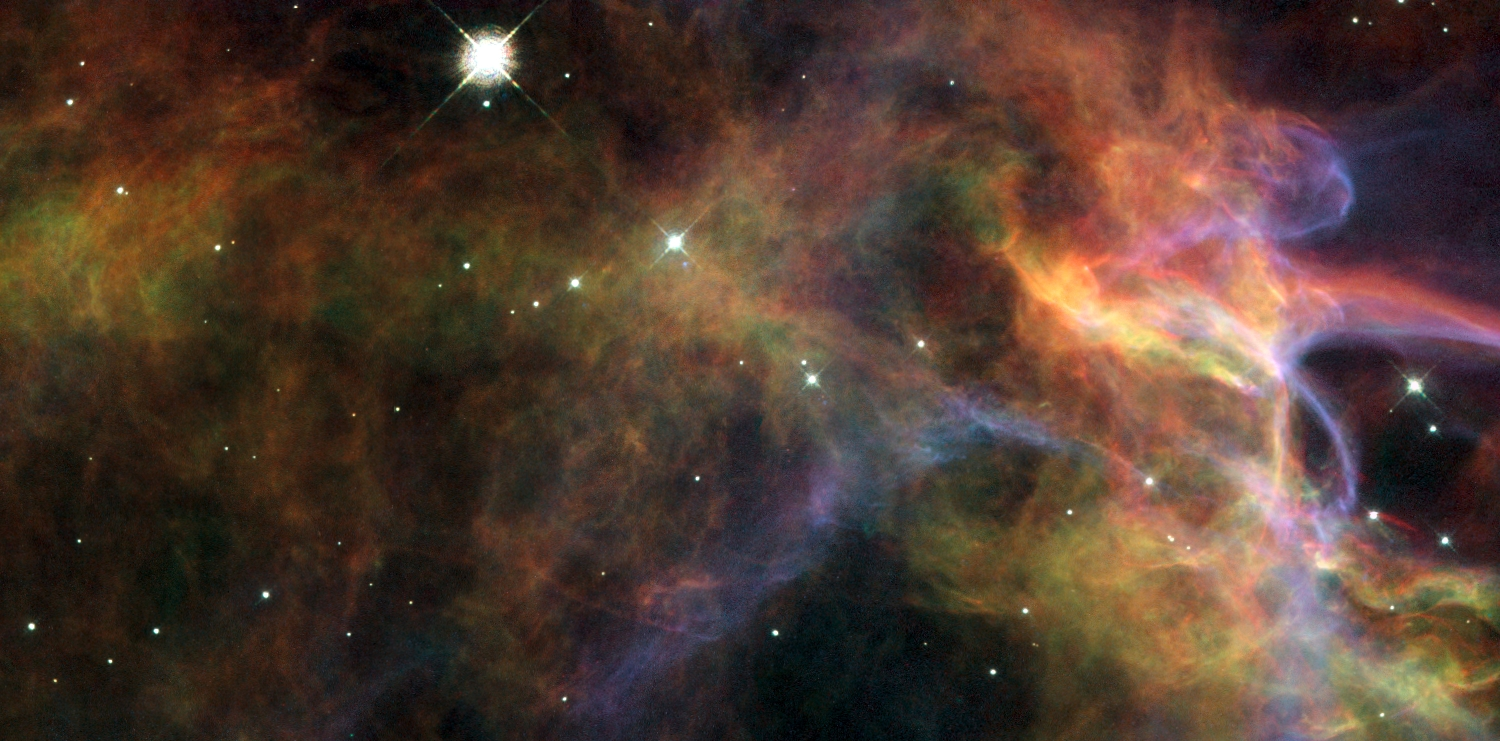

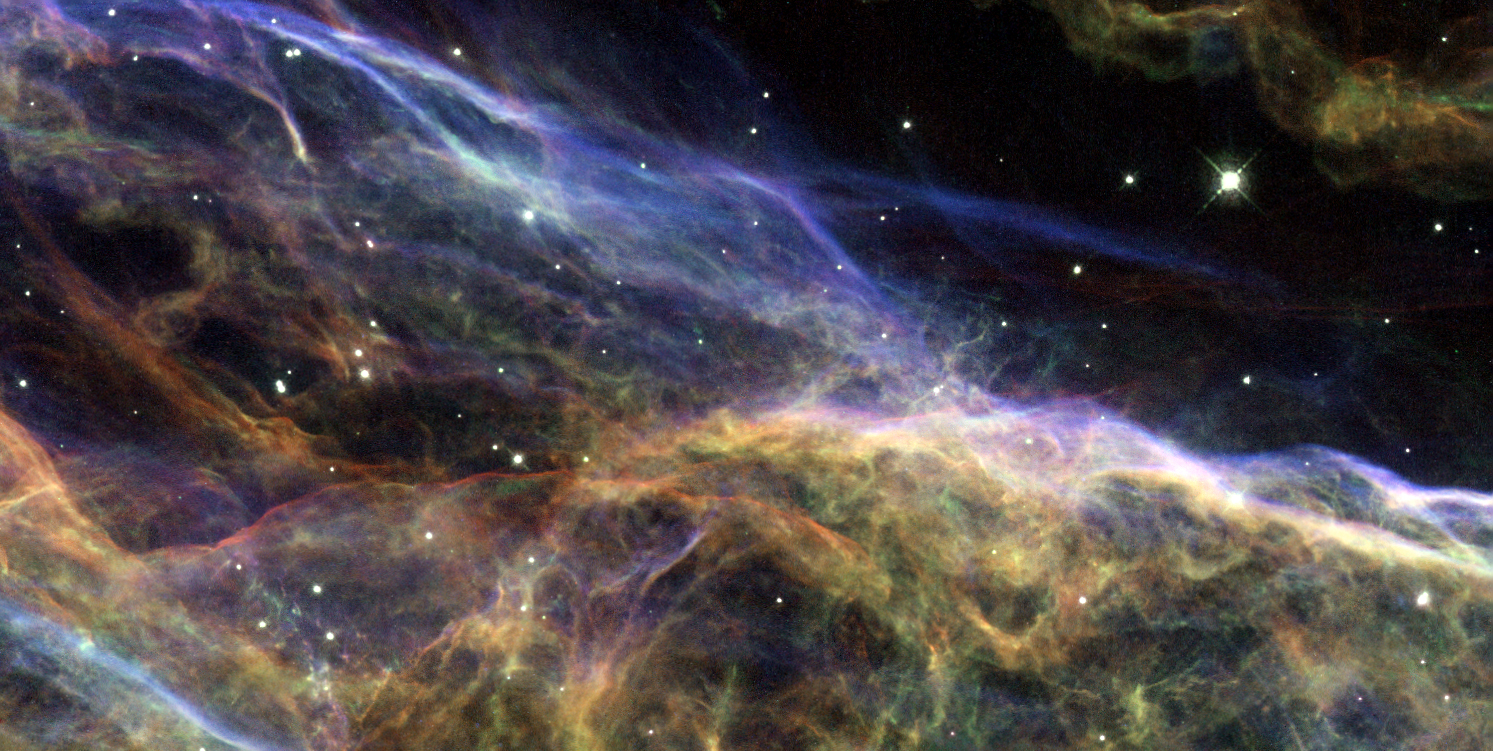

The brightest parts of the visual portion of the Cygnus Loop are known as the Veil Nebula, also called the Cirrus Nebula or the Filamentary Nebula. Several components have separate names and identifiers, including the "Western Veil" or "Witch's Broom", the "Eastern Veil", and Pickering's Triangle.

=== NGC 6960 ===
NGC 6960, the Western Veil, is the western part of the remnant, also known as the "Witch's Broom", located at J2000 RA 20^{h} 45^{m} 58.1^{s} Dec +30° 35′ 43″. As the westernmost NGC object in the nebula (first in right ascension), its number is sometimes used as an NGC identifier for the nebula as a whole.

=== NGC 6992, NGC 6995, and IC 1340 ===
These three luminous areas make up the Eastern Veil. NGC 6992 is an HI shell located along the north-eastern edge of the loop at J2000 RA 20^{h} 56^{m} 19.0^{s} Dec +31° 44′ 34″. NGC 6995 is located farther south at J2000 RA 20^{h} 57^{m} 10.7^{s} Dec +31° 14′ 07″, and IC 1340 even farther south at J2000 RA 20^{h} 56^{m} 12.0^{s} Dec +31° 04′ 00″.

=== Pickering's Triangle ===
Also known as Pickering's Wedge, or Pickering's Triangular Wisp, this segment of relatively faint nebulosity was discovered photographically in 1904 by Williamina Fleming at Harvard Observatory, where Edward Charles Pickering was director at the time. The Triangle is brightest along the northern side of the loop, though photographs show the nebulosity extending into the central area as well.

=== NGC 6974 and NGC 6979 ===
These two objects are generally identified today (as by the NGC/IC Project and Uranometria) with two brighter knots of nebulosity in a cloud at the northern edge of the loop, to the east of the northern edge of Pickering's Triangle. NGC 6979 was reported by William Herschel, and while the coordinates he recorded for Veil objects were somewhat imprecise, his position for this one is tolerably close to the knot at J2000 RA 20^{h} 50^{m} 27.9^{s} Dec +32° 01′ 33″.

The identifier NGC 6979 is sometimes taken to refer to Pickering's Triangle, but the Triangle is probably not what Herschel saw or what the Catalogue intended for this entry: it was discovered only photographically, after the Catalogue was published, and long after Herschel's observation.

NGC 6974 was reported by Lord Rosse, but the position he gave lies in an empty region inside the main loop. It was assumed that he recorded the position incorrectly, and the New General Catalogue gives Rosse's object as the other knot in the northern cloud, located at J2000 RA 20^{h} 51^{m} 04.3^{s} Dec +31° 49′ 41″, one degree north of Rosse's position. (This position is farther east than NGC 6979, even though NGC objects are generally ordered by increasing RA.) These filaments in the north-central area are sometimes known as the "carrot". The spectrum at 34.5 MHz of the region associated with NGC 6974 ranges straight over the entire frequency range 25 to 5000 MHz.

== Southeastern knot ==
The southeastern knot is located at J2000 RA 20^{h} 56^{m} 21.2^{s} Dec +30° 23′ 59″ on the southeastern rim of the Cygnus Loop. The knot has been identified as an encounter between the blast wave from the supernova and a small isolated cloud. The knot is a prominent X-ray feature, consisting of a number of filaments correlated with visual line emission. By combining visual and X-ray data, it can be shown that the southeastern knot is an indentation on the surface of the blast wave, not a small cloud but the tip of a larger cloud. The presence of a reverse shock is evidence that the knot represents an early stage of a blast wave encountering a large cloud.

== Distance ==
Until 1999, the most often-quoted distance to the supernova remnant was a 1958 estimate made by R. Minkowski, combining his radial velocity measurements with E. Hubble's proper motion study of the remnant's optical filaments to calculate a distance of 770 parsecs or 2500 light-years. However, in 1999, William Blair, assuming that the shock wave should be expanding at the same rate in all directions, compared the angular expansion along the sides of the bubble (visible in Hubble Space Telescope images) with direct line-of-sight measurements of the radial expansion towards the Earth and concluded that the actual size of the bubble was about 40% smaller than the conventional value, leading to a distance of about 1470 ly.

A larger revised value of 540 pc (1760 ly) appeared to be corroborated by Blair's later discovery, via the Far Ultraviolet Spectroscopic Explorer (FUSE), of a star seemingly behind the Veil. A UV spectrum of this star, KPD 2055+3111 of spectral type sdOB, showed absorption lines in its spectrum indicate that its light is partially intercepted by the supernova remnant. With an estimated (but uncertain) distance of about 1860 ly away, this star seemed to support the revised estimate of 1760 ly.

More recent investigations of the Cygnus Loop's distance using Gaia parallax measurements of several stars seen toward the Cygnus Loop have led to more accurate distance estimates. One of these stars, a 9.6 magnitude B8 star (BD+31 4224) located near the remnant's northwestern rim shows evidence of interactions of its stellar wind with the Cygnus Loop's shock wave, thereby indicating it is located actually inside the remnant. This star's Gaia estimated distance of around 730 pc, along with two other stars both at about 740 pc which exhibit spectral features indicating they must lie behind the remnant, leads to new distance of 725 $\pm$15 pc or around 2400 light-years. The Gaia estimated distance to the sdOB star KPD 2055+3111 is 819 pc (2,670 ly). This new distance, surprisingly close to the value estimated some 60 years ago by Minkowski, means the Cygnus Loop is physically some 37 pc (120 ly) in diameter and has an age of around 20,000 years.

== Astronomical ultraviolet source ==
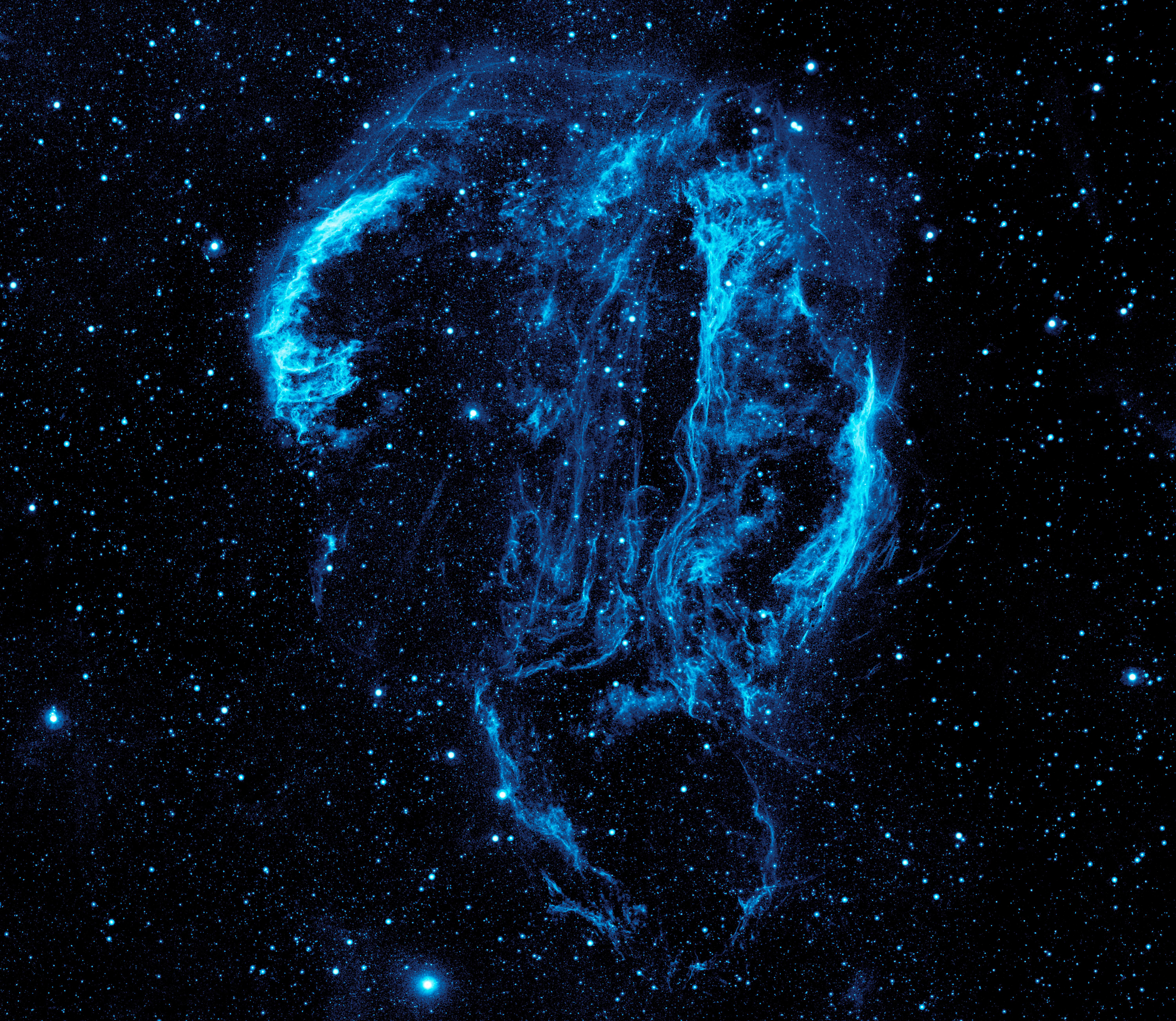
Ultraviolet view of Cygnus loop

The brightest far-ultraviolet sources of the Cygnus Loop occur in the north-east edge of the remnant. The first flight of the High Resolution Emission Line Spectrometer (HIRELS), a wide-field, far-ultraviolet nebular spectrometer, tuned to OVI emission lines, was launched aboard a Nike-Black Brant from White Sands Missile Range to observe the Cygnus Loop, the first observed galactic OVI emission line source.

== X-ray source ==
The X-ray source Cygnus X-5 coincides with SNR G074.0-08.6 (the Cygnus Loop), located at J2000 RA 20^{h} 51.1^{m} Dec +30° 41′, observed by Uhuru at 4U 2046+31. This source also has catalogue numbers 1E 2049.4+3050, 1H 2050+310, and 1M 2051+309, having been observed by the Einstein Observatory, HEAO 1, and OSO 7, respectively.

The Cygnus Loop is a strong source of soft X-rays.

The center of the supernova shell as determined from X-ray data lies at J1950 RA 20^{h} 49^{m} 45^{s} Dec +30° 53′. A characteristic thermal temperature averaged over the loop from X-ray spectral data is T_{x} = 2.9 ± 1.5 million K. An X-ray surface brightness map of the loop was obtained with a one-dimensional X-ray telescope flown aboard an Aerobee 170 sounding rocket launched on March 30, 1973, from the White Sands Missile Range.

== Searches for a compact stellar remnant ==
Most stars that produce supernovae leave behind compact stellar remnants- a neutron star or black hole, typically depending on the mass of the original star. Various techniques based on the features of the supernova remnant estimate the Cygnus Loop progenitor star's mass at 12 to 15 Solar masses, a value that puts the expected remnant firmly within neutron star boundaries. However, despite many searches, no compact stellar remnant had been confidently identified since the identification of the supernova remnant.

A noted anomaly is that in X-rays, the nebula appears perfectly spherical aside from a "blowout region" to the south. Searches for a compact stellar remnant have been largely concentrated here, as the hole may have been caused by the violent ejection of a neutron star. A detailed 2012 study of the blowout region identified a possible pulsar wind nebula, as well as a point-like source within it. Although at almost exactly the same position as a known Seyfert galaxy, the slight offset combined with a lack of a radio counterpart makes the point-like source probably unrelated to the galaxy. Whether the feature is a pulsar wind nebula, and if so whether it is related to the Cygnus Loop, is still unknown for certain. If it is indeed the compact stellar remnant of the supernova, the neutron star would have to have been ejected from the center of the nebula at a speed of roughly 1,850 km/s, depending on the precise age and distance of the remnant.

== Fiction ==
In the novel Mindbridge by Joe Haldeman, the Cygnus Loop is the remains of the home star of an omnipotent, immortal race that ultimately decided to destroy itself.

== See also ==
- X-ray astronomy
- Radio astronomy
- Ultraviolet astronomy
