= Space Variable Objects Monitor =

Small X-ray telescope satellite

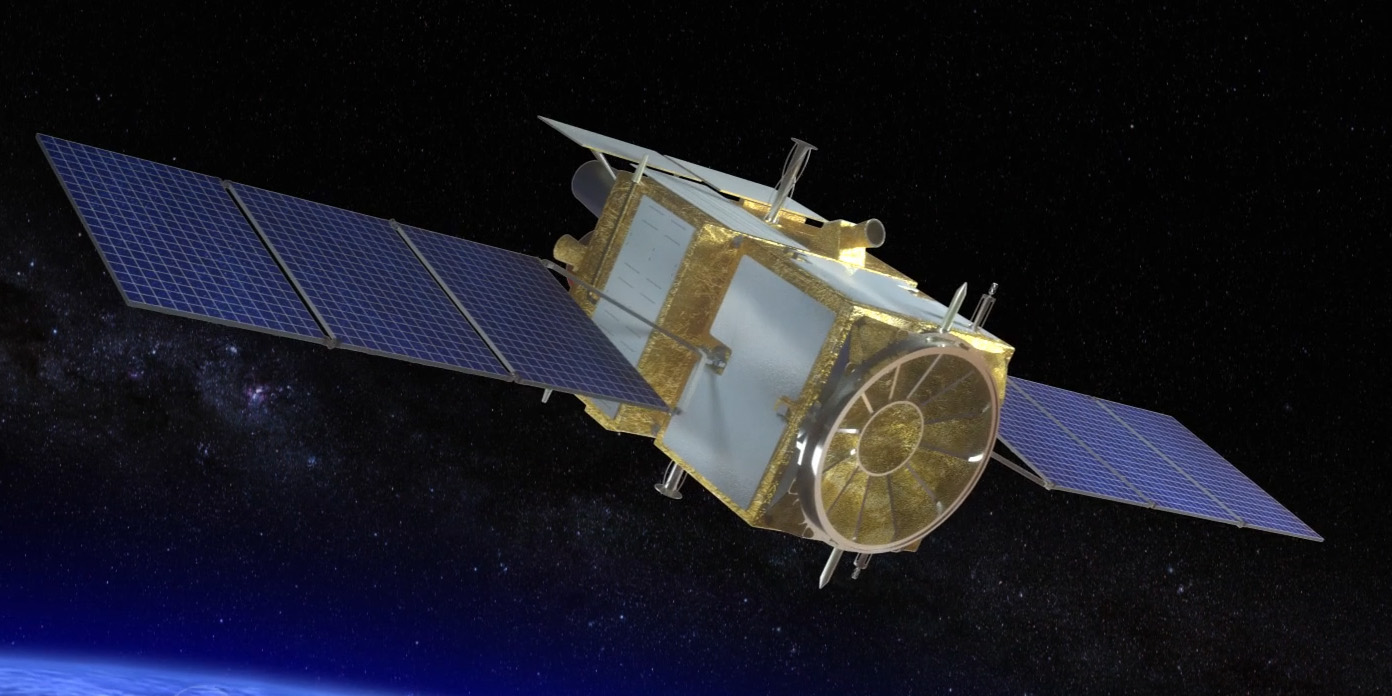
- SVOM artist impression
- Names: Spaceborne multiband astronomical Variable Objects Monitor mission
- Mission type: Gamma-ray burst observatory
- Operator: CNES / CNSA
- COSPAR ID: 2024-116A
- SATCAT no.: 60088
- Website: http://www.svom.fr/en/
- Mission duration: 3 years (planned); Elapsed: 1 year, 11 months and 2 days

Spacecraft properties
- Spacecraft: SVOM
- Launch mass: 950 kg (2,090 lb)
- Dimensions: 2.5 × 2.8 m (8 ft 2 in × 9 ft 2 in)
- Power: 800 watts

Start of mission
- Launch date: 22 June 2024 (07:00:00 UTC)
- Rocket: Long March 2C
- Launch site: Xichang Satellite Launch Center
- Contractor: China Aerospace Science and Technology Corporation (CASC)

Orbital parameters
- Reference system: Geocentric orbit
- Regime: Low Earth orbit
- Perigee altitude: 625 km (388 mi)
- Apogee altitude: 625 km (388 mi)
- Inclination: 30°
- Period: 90.0 minutes
Instruments
- ECLAIRs: Wide-field camera
- GRM: Gamma-ray Burst Monitor
- MXT: Microchannel X-ray Telescope
- VT: Visible Telescope
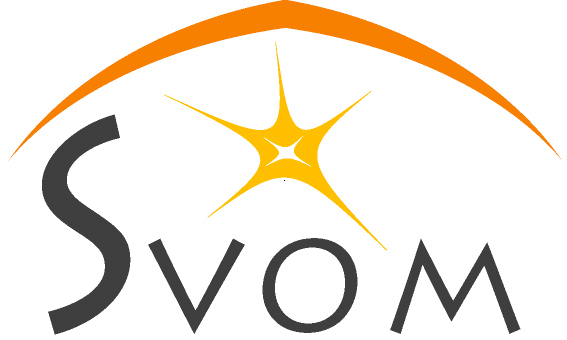
- Space Variable Objects Monitor

The Space Variable Objects Monitor (SVOM) is a small X-ray telescope satellite developed by China National Space Administration (CNSA), Chinese Academy of Sciences (CAS) and the French Space Agency (CNES), launched on 22 June 2024 (07:00:00 UTC).

SVOM will study the explosions of massive stars by analysing the resulting gamma-ray bursts. The light-weight X-ray mirror for SVOM weighs just 1 kg (2.2 lb). SVOM will add new capabilities to the work of finding gamma-ray bursts currently being done by the multinational satellite Swift Gamma-Ray Burst Mission. Its anti-solar pointing strategy makes the Earth cross the field of view of its payload every orbit.

== Objectives ==
Using synergy between space and ground instruments, the mission has these scientific objectives:

- Permit the detection of all known types of Gamma-ray bursts (GRB)
- Provide fast, reliable GRB positions
- Measure the broadband spectral shape of the prompt emission (from visible to MeV)
- Measure the temporal properties of the prompt emission (from visible to MeV)
- Quickly identify the afterglows of detected GRBs at X-ray and optical wavelengths, including those which are highly redshifted (z>6)
- Measure the broadband spectral shape of the early and late afterglow (from visible to X-rays)
- Measure the temporal evolution of the early and late afterglow (from visible to X-rays)

== Scientific instruments ==
The selected orbit is circular with an altitude of 600 km (370 mi) and an inclination angle of 30° with a precession period of 60 days. The payload is composed of the following four main instruments:

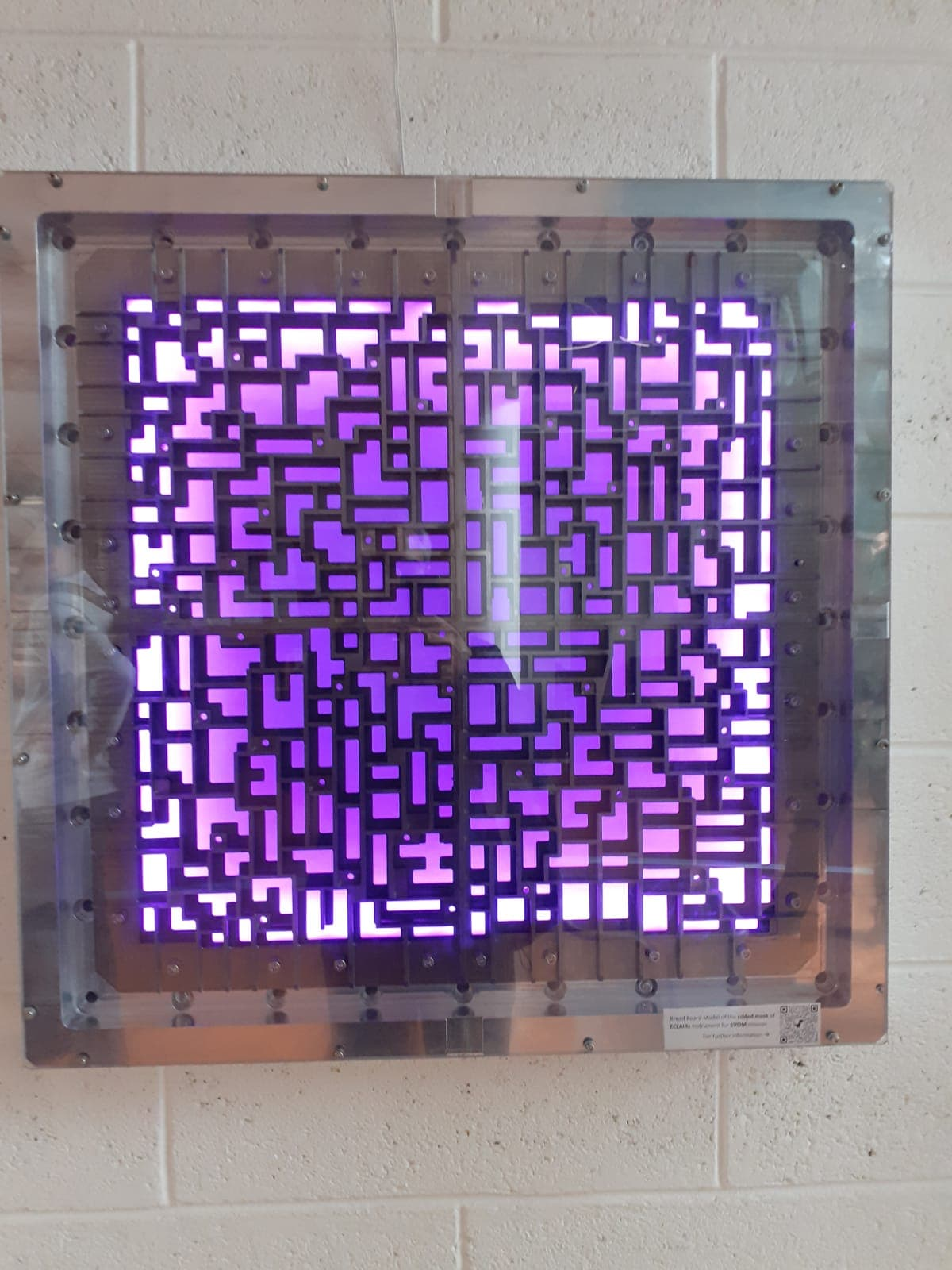
ECLAIRs coded mask

ECLAIRs
ECLAIRs is a wide-field (~2 sr) coded mask camera with a mask transparency of 40% and a 1,024 cm^{2} (158.7 sq in) detection plane coupled to a data processing unit, so-called UGTS, which is in charge of locating GRBs in near real time image and rate triggers. The trigger system of the coded-mask telescope ECLAIRs onboard SVOM images the sky in the 4-120 keV energy range, in order to detect and localize GRB in its 2 sr-wide field of view. The low-energy threshold of ECLAIRs is well suited for the detection of highly red-shifted GRB. ECLAIRs is expected to detect ~200 GRBs of all types during the nominal 3 year mission lifetime. To reach a 4 keV low-energy threshold, the ECLAIRs detection plane is paved with 6400 4×4 mm^{2} and 1 mm-thick Schottky CdTe detectors. The detectors are grouped by 32, in 8x4 matrices read by a low-noise ASIC, forming elementary modules called XRDPIX.

Gamma-ray Burst Monitor (GRM)
A gamma-ray non-imaging spectrometer (GRM), sensitive in the 50 keV to 5 MeV domain, will extend the prompt emission energy coverage. GRB alerts are sent in real-time to the ground observers community.

Microchannel X-ray Telescope (MXT)
A spacecraft slew is performed in order to place the GRB within the narrow fields of view of two instruments - a soft X-ray telescope (MXT) and a visible-band telescope (VT), to refine the GRB position and study the early phases of the GRB afterglow. MXT uses lobster-eye optics that will give it a wide field of view.

Visible Telescope (VT)
A 45 cm (18 in) visible telescope operating from 400 to 950 nm, with a FOV of 21 × 21 arcminutes. It will reach a sensitivity of about 23 magnitudes, in the R band, in a 300 seconds exposure time, at 5 seconds.

== Ground segment ==
The ground segment includes a set of three ground-based dedicated instruments – two robotic Ground Follow-up Telescopes (GFT) and an optical monitor, Ground Wide Angle Camera (GWAC) – which will complement the space borne instruments. A large fraction of GRB will have redshift determinations, an observing strategy optimized to facilitate follow-up observations by large ground-based spectroscopic telescopes.

A key elements of the SVOM mission are the Ground Wide Angle Cameras (GWACs) and the Ground Follow-up Telescopes (GFTs).

Ground Wide Angle Cameras (GWACs)
The GWACs, an array of wide FoV optical cameras operating in the optical domain, will permit a systematic study of the visible emission during and before the prompt high-energy emission. It will cover a field of view of about 8000 deg², with a sensitivity of about 15 magnitudes at 5 seconds (under the full Moon condition), in the V band and with a 15 seconds exposure time. It will monitor continuously the field covered by ECLAIRs in order to observe the visible emissions of more than 20% of the events, at least 5 minutes before and 15 minutes after the GRB trigger.

Ground Follow-up Telescopes (GFT)
The GFTs, two robotic 1-meter class telescopes (one managed by France, another one by China), will point automatically their field-of view towards the space-given error box within tens of seconds after the alert reception and will provide panchromatic follow-up (visible to near-infrared). They will contribute to the improvement of the link between the scientific payload and the largest telescopes by measuring the celestial coordinates with an accuracy better than 0.5″, and by providing an estimate of its photometric redshift in less than 5 minutes after the beginning of the observations. This data will be available to the scientific community through an alert message. Evenly placed on the Earth (one in South America in a place to be defined, the other one in China), they will be in a position to start the research of the GRB optical emission immediately after the alert reception in more than 40% of the cases.

== Results ==
Marking almost its first full year since launch, on June 10, 2025 SVOM reported its till then 23rd Gamma Ray Burst event GRB 250610B through circular GCN 40671.

== See also ==
- List of gamma-ray bursts
- List of X-ray space telescopes
