= X-ray telescope =

Telescope designed to observe remote objects by detecting X-rays

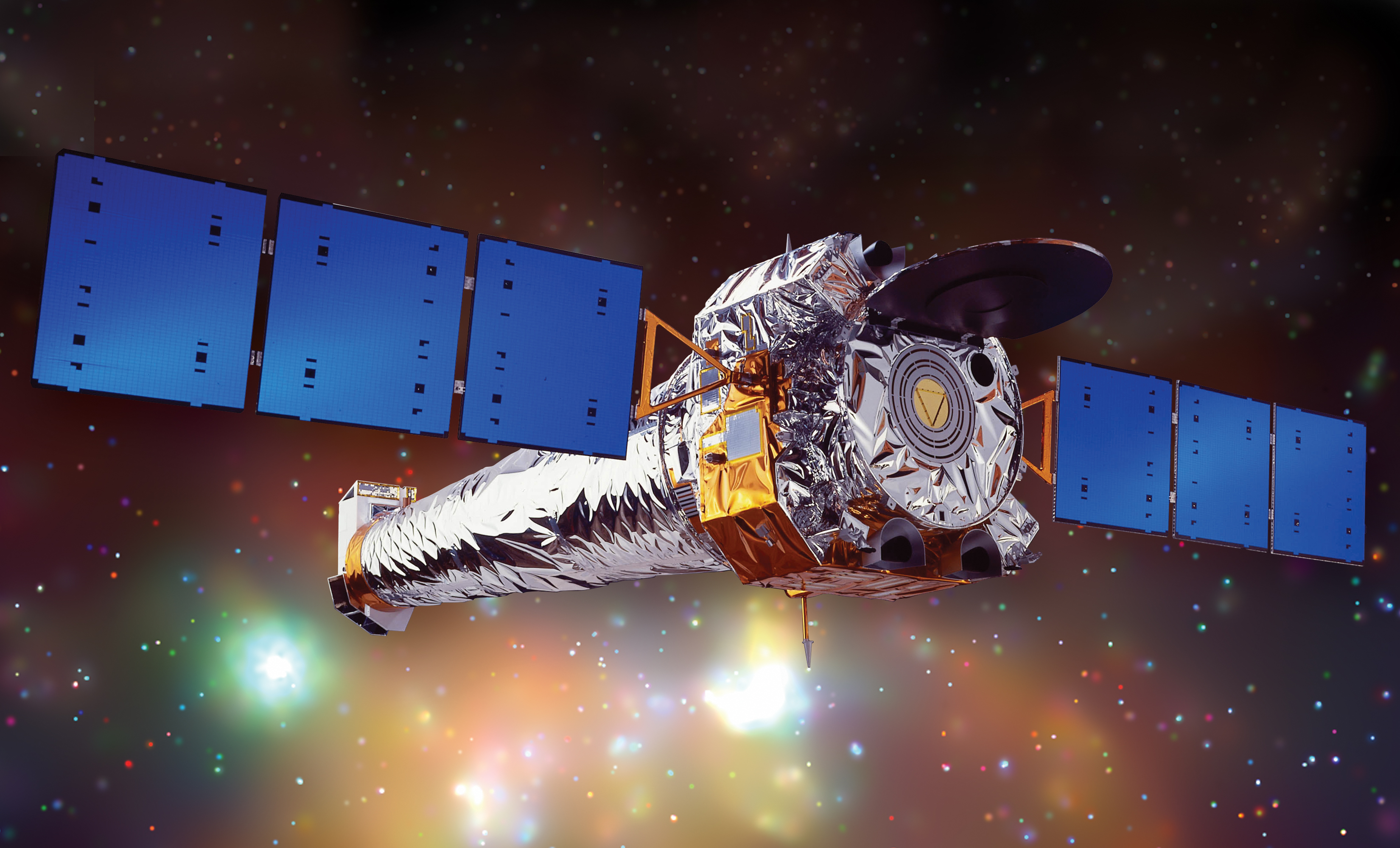
Chandra X-ray Observatory, launched by NASA in 1999, is still operational as of 2024

An X-ray telescope (XRT) is a telescope that is designed to observe remote objects in the X-ray spectrum. X-rays are absorbed by the Earth's atmosphere, so instruments to detect X-rays must be taken to high altitude by balloons, sounding rockets, or satellites.

The basic elements of such a telescope are the optics (focusing or collimating) that collect the radiation entering the telescope, and the detector, with which the radiation is collected and measured. A variety of different designs and technologies have been used for these elements.

Many X-ray telescopes on satellites are compounded of multiple small detector-telescope systems whose capabilities add up or complement each other, and additional fixed or removable elements (filters, spectrometers) that add functionalities to the instrument.

== History of X-ray telescopes ==
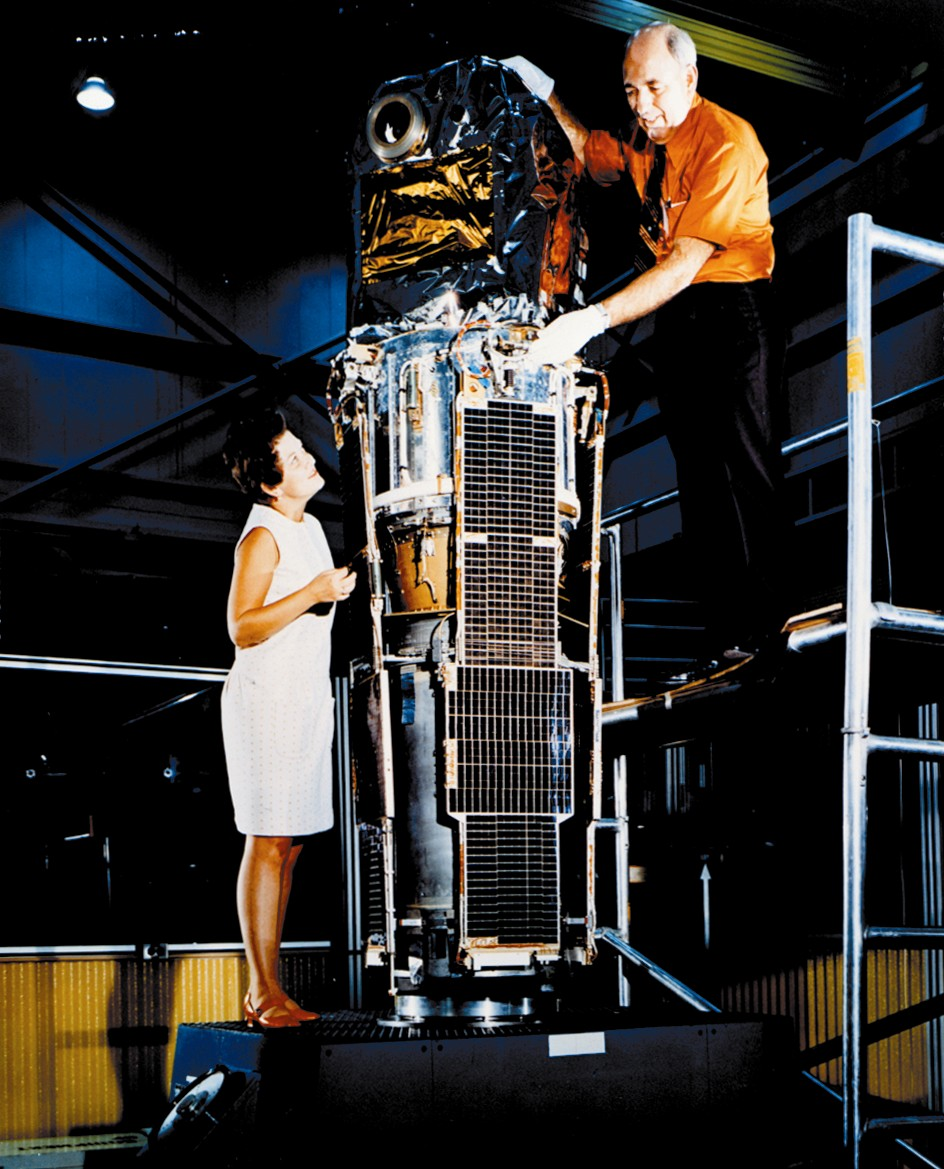
Uhuru X-ray satellite

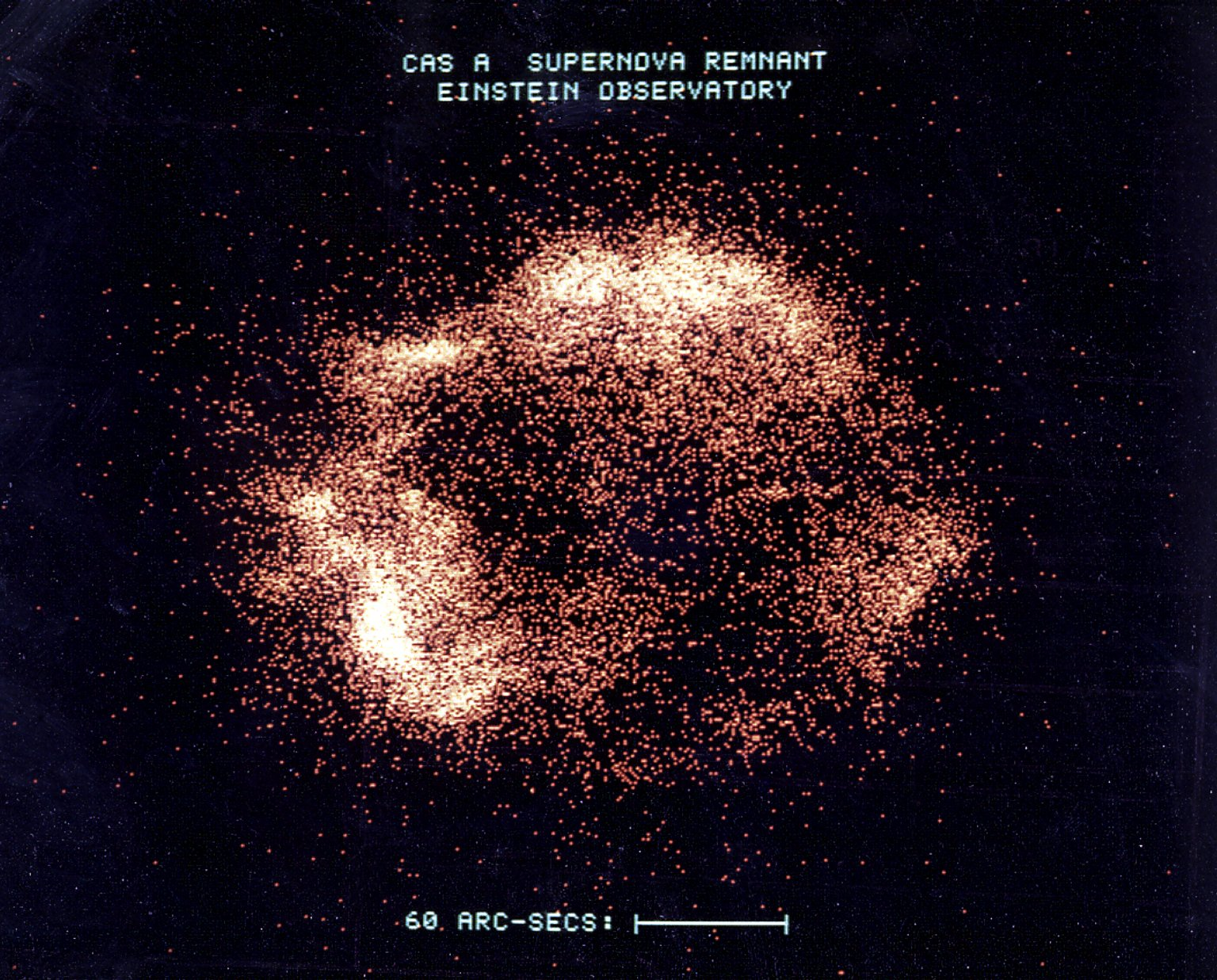
Photo of supernova remnant Cassiopeia A, taken by the first imaging X-ray telescope, Einstein Observatory.

X-ray telescopes were first used for astronomy to observe the Sun, which was the only source in the sky bright enough in X-rays for those early telescopes to detect. Because the Sun is so bright in X-rays, early X-ray telescopes could use a small focusing element and the X-rays would be detected with photographic film. The first X-ray picture of the Sun from a rocket-borne telescope was taken by John V. Lindsay of the NASA Goddard Space Flight Center and collaborators in 1963. The first orbiting X-ray telescope flew on Skylab in the early 1970s and recorded more than 35,000 full-disk images of the Sun over a 9-month period.

First specialised X-ray satellite, Uhuru, was launched by NASA in 1970. It detected 339 X-ray sources in its 2.5-year lifetime.

The Einstein Observatory, launched in 1978, was the first imaging X-ray observatory. It obtained high-resolution X-ray images in the energy range from 0.1 to 4 keV of stars of all types, supernova remnants, galaxies, and clusters of galaxies. Another large project was ROSAT (active from 1990 to 1999), which was a heavy X-ray space observatory with focusing X-ray optics, and European EXOSAT.

The Chandra X-ray Observatory was launched by NASA in 1999 and has operated for more than 25 years in a high elliptical orbit, returning thousands 0.5 arc-second images and high-resolution spectra of all kinds of astronomical objects in the energy range from 0.5 to 8.0 keV. Chandra's resolution is about 50 times superior to that of ROSAT.

== Active X-ray observatory satellites ==
Satellites in use today include ESA's XMM-Newton observatory (low to mid energy X-rays 0.1-15 keV), NASA's Swift observatory, Chandra observatory and IXPE telescope. JAXA has launched the XRISM telescope, while ISRO has launched Aditya-L1 and XPoSat.

The GOES 14 spacecraft carries on board a Solar X-ray Imager to monitor the Sun's X-rays for the early detection of solar flares, coronal mass ejections, and other phenomena that impact the geospace environment. It was launched into orbit on June 27, 2009, at 22:51 GMT from Space Launch Complex 37B at the Cape Canaveral Air Force Station.

The Chinese Hard X-ray Modulation Telescope was launched on June 15, 2017 to observe black holes, neutron stars, active galactic nuclei and other phenomena based on their X-ray and gamma-ray emissions.

The Lobster-Eye X-ray Satellite was launched on 25 July 2020 by CNSA making it is the first in-orbit telescope to utilize the lobster-eye imaging technology of ultra-large field of view imaging to search for dark matter signals in the x-ray energy range. Lobster Eye Imager for Astronomy was launched on 27 July 2022 as a technology demonstrator for Einstein Probe, launched on January 9, 2024, dedicated to time-domain high-energy astrophysics. The Space Variable Objects Monitor observatory launched on 22 June 2024 is directed towards studying the explosions of massive stars and analysis of gamma-ray bursts.

A soft X-ray solar imaging telescope is on board the GOES-13 weather satellite launched using a Delta IV from Cape Canaveral LC37B on May 24, 2006. However, there have been no GOES 13 SXI images since December 2006.

The Russian-German Spektr-RG carries the eROSITA telescope array as well as the ART-XC telescope. It was launched by Roscosmos on 13 July 2019 from Baikonur and began collecting data in October 2019.

== Optics ==
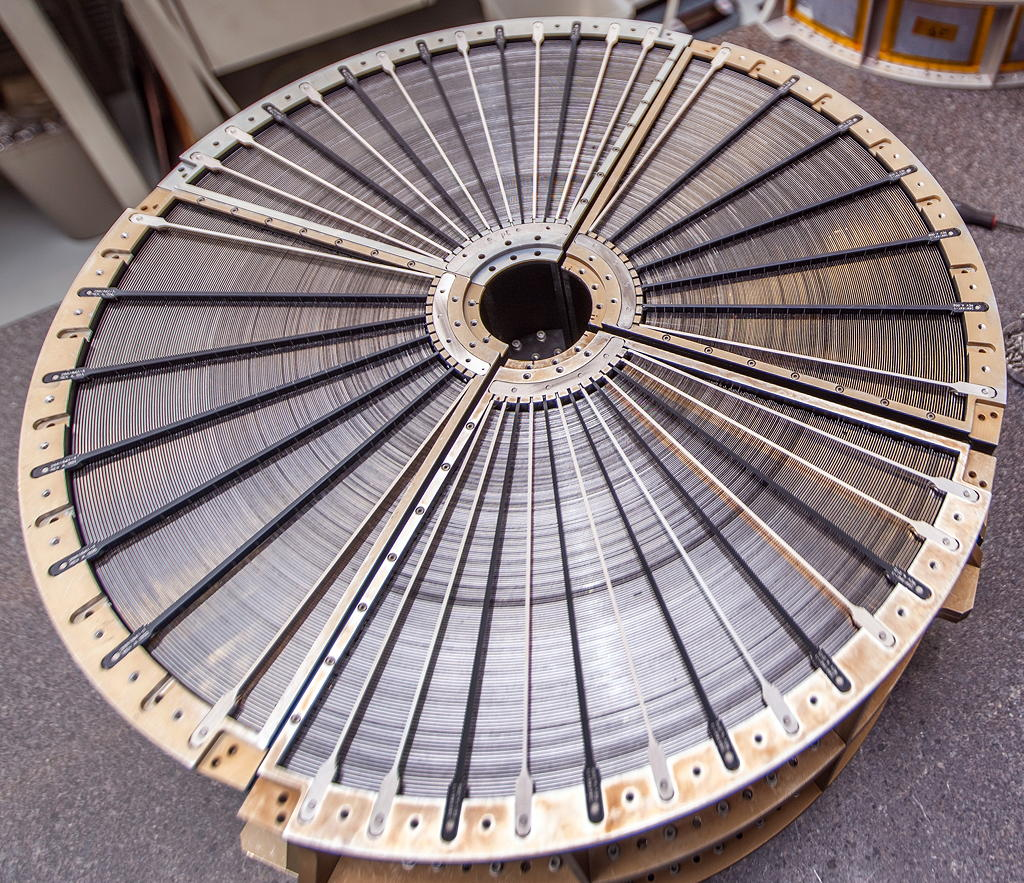
One of the mirrors of XRISM made of 203 foils

The most common methods used in X-ray optics are grazing incidence mirrors and collimated apertures. Only three geometries that use grazing incidence reflection of X-rays to produce X-ray images are known: Wolter system, Kirkpatrick-Baez system, and lobster-eye optics.

=== Focusing mirrors ===
Focusing X-rays with glancing reflection

A simple parabolic mirror was originally proposed in 1960 by Riccardo Giacconi and Bruno Rossi, the founders of extrasolar X-ray astronomy. This type of mirror is often used as the primary reflector in an optical telescope. However, images of off-axis objects would be severely blurred. The German physicist Hans Wolter showed in 1952 that the reflection off a combination of two elements, a paraboloid followed by a hyperboloid, would work far better for X-ray astronomy applications. Wolter described three different imaging configurations, the Types I, II, and III. The design most commonly used by X-ray astronomers is the Type I since it has the simplest mechanical configuration. In addition, the Type I design offers the possibility of nesting several telescopes inside one another, thereby increasing the useful reflecting area. The Wolter Type II is useful only as a narrow-field imager or as the optic for a dispersive spectrometer. The Wolter Type III has never been employed for X-ray astronomy.

With respect to collimated optics, focusing optics allow:

- a high resolution imaging
- a high telescope sensitivity: since radiation is focused on a small area, Signal-to-noise ratio is much higher for this kind of instruments.

The mirrors can be made of ceramic or metal foil coated with a thin layer of a reflective material (typically gold or iridium). Mirrors based on this construction work on the basis of total reflection of light at grazing incidence.

This technology is limited in energy range due to the fact that the critical angle for total reflection is inversely proportional to the X-ray photon energy, meaning that higher energy photons require smaller incidence angles and therefore longer telescope designs. The limit in the early 2000s with Chandra and XMM-Newton X-ray observatories was about 15 kilo-electronvolt (keV) light. Using new multi-layered coated mirrors, the X-ray mirror for the NuSTAR telescope pushed this up to 79 keV light. To reflect at this level, glass layers were multi-coated with tungsten (W)/silicon (Si) or platinum (Pt)/silicon carbide(SiC).

=== Collimating optics ===
While earlier X-ray telescopes were using simple collimating techniques (e.g. rotating collimators, wire collimators), the technology most used in the present day employs coded aperture masks. This technique uses a flat aperture patterned grille in front of the detector. Compared to grazing incidence (focusing) telescopes, this design offers a larger field of view and can be employed at higher energies, making it more useful for imaging 'hard' (high energy) X-rays and gamma rays, where the photon energy exceeds 10-20 keV. On the other hand, coded aperture telescopes are less sensitive than grazing incidence techniques, meaning that the latter may be preferred for imaging lower enregy X-rays.

Example X-ray telescopes that use coded apertures include the Ultra-Fast Flash Observatory Pathfinder (launched 2016), the Cadmium Zinc Telluride Imager (CZTI) aboard Astrosat (launched 2015), and the ECLAIRs camera aboard Space Variable Objects Monitor (launched 2024).

== Detection and imaging of X-rays ==
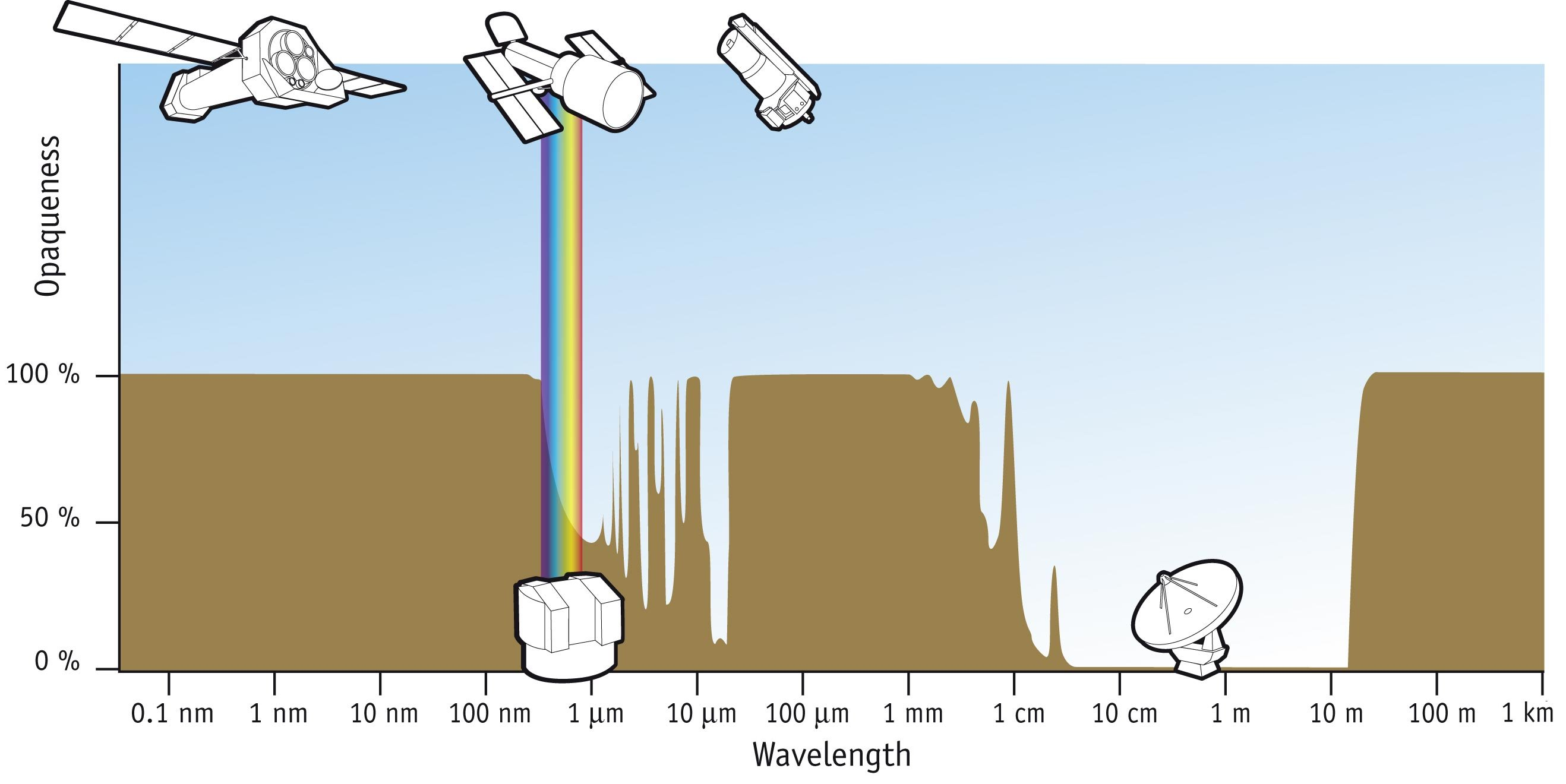
X-rays start at ~0.008 nm and extend across the electromagnetic spectrum to ~8 nm, over which Earth's atmosphere is opaque.

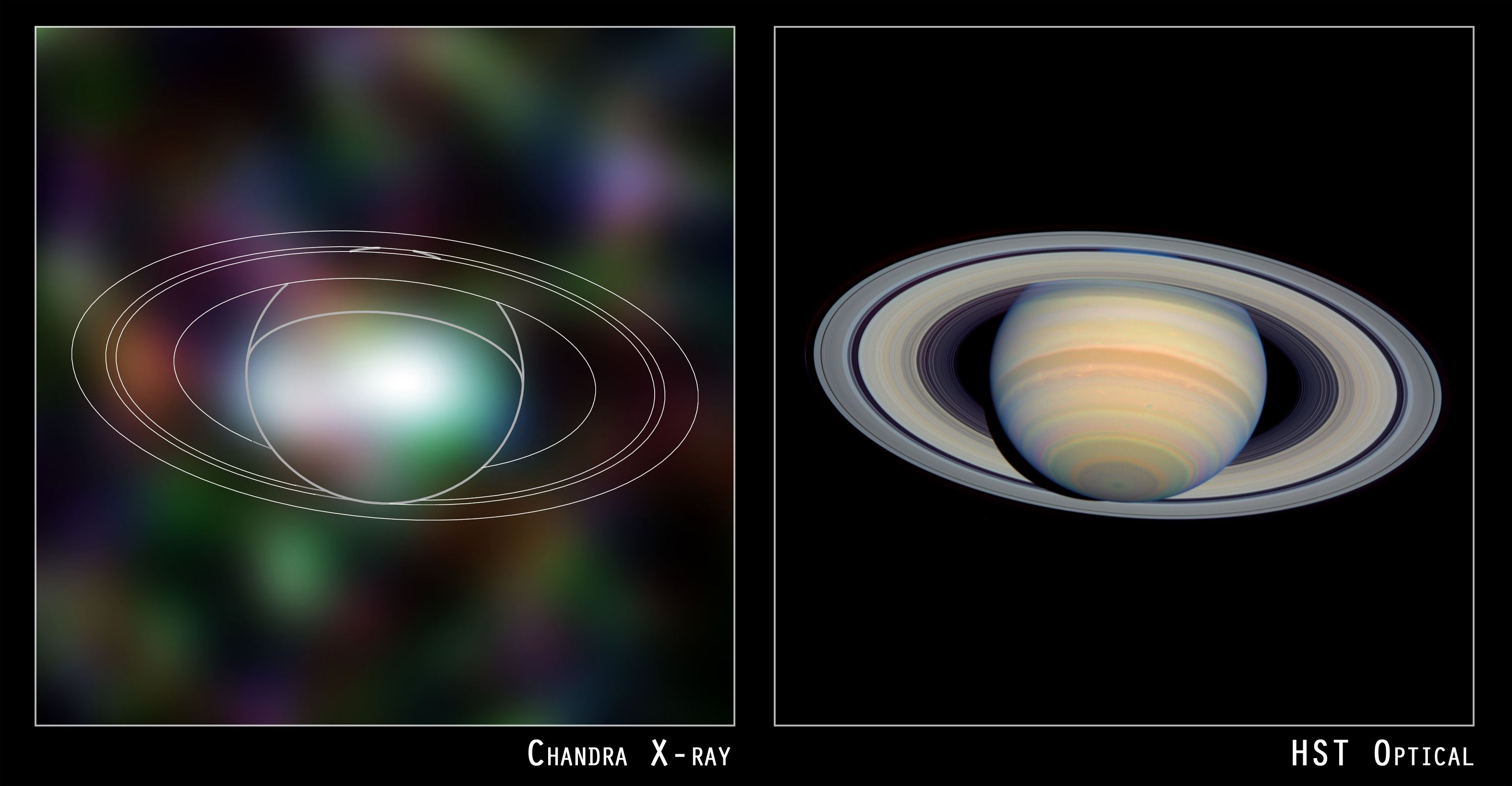
Chandra's image of Saturn (left) and Hubble optical image of Saturn (right). Saturn's X-ray spectrum is similar to that of X-rays from the Sun. 14 April 2003

X-rays has a huge span in wavelength (~8 nm - 8 pm), frequency (~50 PHz - 50 EHz) and energy (~0.12 - 120 keV). In terms of temperature, 1 eV = 11,604 K. Thus X-rays (0.12 to 120 keV) correspond to 1.39 million to 1.39 billion K. From 10 to 0.1 nanometers (nm) (about 0.12 to 12 keV) they are classified as soft X-rays, and from 0.1 nm to 0.01 nm (about 12 to 120 keV) as hard X-rays.

Closer to the visible range of the electromagnetic spectrum is the ultraviolet. The draft ISO standard on determining solar irradiances (ISO-DIS-21348) describes the ultraviolet as ranging from ~10 nm to ~400 nm. That portion closest to X-rays is often referred to as the "extreme ultraviolet" (EUV or XUV). When an EUV photon is absorbed, photoelectrons and secondary electrons are generated by ionization, much like what happens when X-rays or electron beams are absorbed by matter.

The distinction between X-rays and gamma rays has changed in recent decades. Originally, the electromagnetic radiation emitted by X-ray tubes had a longer wavelength than the radiation emitted by radioactive nuclei (gamma rays). So older literature distinguished between X- and gamma radiation on the basis of wavelength, with radiation shorter than some arbitrary wavelength, such as 10^{−11} m, defined as gamma rays. However, as shorter wavelength continuous spectrum "X-ray" sources such as linear accelerators and longer wavelength "gamma ray" emitters were discovered, the wavelength bands largely overlapped. The two types of radiation are now usually distinguished by their origin: X-rays are emitted by electrons outside the nucleus, while gamma rays are emitted by the nucleus.

Although the more energetic X-rays, photons with an energy greater than 30 keV (4,800 aJ), can penetrate the Earth's atmosphere at least for distances of a few meters, the Earth's atmosphere is thick enough that virtually none are able to penetrate from outer space all the way to the Earth's surface. X-rays in the 0.5 to 5 keV (80 to 800 aJ) range, where most celestial sources give off the bulk of their energy, can be stopped by a few sheets of paper; 90% of the photons in a beam of 3 keV (480 aJ) X-rays are absorbed by traveling through just 10 cm of air.

=== Proportional counters ===
A proportional counter is a type of gaseous ionization detector that counts particles of ionizing radiation and measures their energy. It works on the same principle as the Geiger-Müller counter, but uses a lower operating voltage. All X-ray proportional counters consist of a windowed gas cell. Often this cell is subdivided into a number of low- and high-electric field regions by some arrangement of electrodes.

Proportional counters were used on EXOSAT, on the US portion of the Apollo–Soyuz mission (July 1975), and on French TOURNESOL instrument.

=== X-ray monitor ===
Monitoring generally means to be aware of the state of a system. A device that displays or sends a signal for displaying X-ray output from an X-ray generating source so as to be aware of the state of the source is referred to as an X-ray monitor in space applications. On Apollo 15 in orbit above the Moon, for example, an X-ray monitor was used to follow the possible variation in solar X-ray intensity and spectral shape while mapping the lunar surface with respect to its chemical composition due to the production of secondary X-rays.

The X-ray monitor of Solwind, designated NRL-608 or XMON, was a collaboration between the Naval Research Laboratory and Los Alamos National Laboratory. The monitor consisted of 2 collimated argon proportional counters.

=== Scintillation detector ===
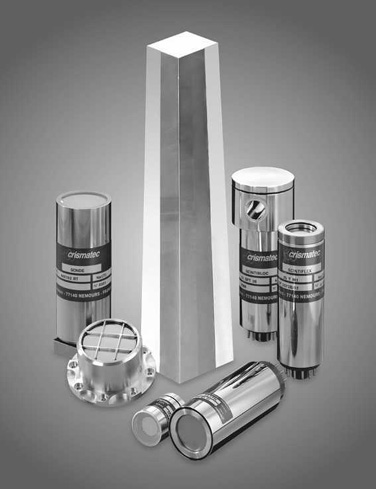
Scintillation crystal surrounded by various scintillation detector assemblies

A scintillator is a material which exhibits the property of luminescence when excited by ionizing radiation. Luminescent materials, when struck by an incoming particle, such as an X-ray photon, absorb its energy and scintillate, i.e. reemit the absorbed energy in the form of a small flash of light, typically in the visible range.

The scintillation X-ray detector were used on Vela 5A and its twin Vela 5B; the X-ray telescope onboard OSO 4 consisted of a single thin NaI(Tl) scintillation crystal plus phototube assembly enclosed in a CsI(Tl) anti-coincidence shield. OSO 5 carried a CsI crystal scintillator. The central crystal was 0.635 cm thick, had a sensitive area of 70 cm^{2}, and was viewed from behind by a pair of photomultiplier tubes.

The PHEBUS had two independent detectors, each detector consisted of a bismuth germinate (BGO) crystal 78 mm in diameter by 120 mm thick. The KONUS-B instrument consisted of seven detectors distributed around the spacecraft that responded to photons of 10 keV to 8 MeV energy. They consisted of NaI(Tl) scintillator crystals 200 mm in diameter by 50 mm thick behind a Be entrance window. Kvant-1 carried the HEXE, or High Energy X-ray Experiment, which employed a phoswich of sodium iodide and caesium iodide.

=== Modulation collimator ===
In electronics, modulation is the process of varying one waveform in relation to another waveform. With a 'modulation collimator' the amplitude (intensity) of the incoming X-rays is reduced by the presence of two or more 'diffraction gratings' of parallel wires that block or greatly reduce that portion of the signal incident upon the wires.

An X-ray collimator is a device that filters a stream of X-rays so that only those traveling parallel to a specified direction are allowed through.

Minoru Oda, President of Tokyo University of Information Sciences, invented the modulation collimator, first used to identify the counterpart of Sco X-1 in 1966, which led to the most accurate positions for X-ray sources available, prior to the launch of X-ray imaging telescopes.

SAS 3 carried modulation collimators (2-11 keV) and Slat and Tube collimators (1 up to 60keV).

On board the Granat Observatory were four WATCH instruments that could localize bright sources in the 6 to 180 keV range to within 0.5° using a Rotation Modulation Collimator. Taken together, the instruments' three fields of view covered approximately 75% of the sky.

The Reuven Ramaty High Energy Solar Spectroscopic Imager (RHESSI), Explorer 81, images solar flares from soft X-rays to gamma rays (~3 keV to ~20 MeV). Its imaging capability is based on a Fourier-transform technique using a set of 9 Rotational Modulation Collimators.

=== X-ray spectrometer ===
OSO 8 had on board a Graphite Crystal X-ray Spectrometer, with energy range of 2-8 keV, FOV 3°.

The Granat ART-S X-ray spectrometer covered the energy range 3 to 100 keV, FOV 2° × 2°. The instrument consisted of four detectors based on spectroscopic MWPCs, making an effective area of 2,400 cm^{2} at 10 keV and 800 cm^{2} at 100 keV. The time resolution was 200 microseconds.

The X-ray spectrometer aboard ISEE-3 was designed to study both solar flares and cosmic gamma-ray bursts over the energy range 5-228 keV. The experiment consisted of 2 cylindrical X-ray detectors: a Xenon filled proportional counter covering 5-14 keV, and a NaI(Tl) scintillator covering 12-1250 keV.

=== CCDs ===
Most existing X-ray telescopes use CCD detectors, similar to those in visible-light cameras. In visible-light, a single photon can produce a single electron of charge in a pixel, and an image is built up by accumulating many such charges from many photons during the exposure time. When an X-ray photon hits a CCD, it produces enough charge (hundreds to thousands of electrons, proportional to its energy) that the individual X-rays have their energies measured on read-out.

=== Microcalorimeters ===
Microcalorimeters can only detect X-rays one photon at a time (but can measure the energy of each).

=== Transition edge sensors ===
Transition-edge sensors are the next step in microcalorimetry. In essence they are super-conducting metals kept as close as possible to their transition temperature. This is the temperature at which these metals become super-conductors and their resistance drops to zero. These transition temperatures are usually just a few degrees above absolute zero (usually less than 10 K).

== See also ==
- List of telescope types
