= ART-XC =

X-ray telescope for high energy photons

ART-XC (Astronomical Roentgen Telescope X-ray Concentrator)
- Mission type: Space observatory
- Operator: Russia, Russian Space Research Institute; Germany, German Aerospace Center
- Mission duration: ≈ 7 years; until late 2026 to early 2027 (planned)

Spacecraft properties
- Spacecraft: Spektr-RG
- Manufacturer: Russian Space Research Institute and All-Russian Scientific Research Institute for Experimental Physics

Start of mission
- Launch date: 13 July 2019, 12:31 UTC
- Rocket: Proton-M
- Launch site: Baikonur 45/1

Orbital parameters
- Reference system: Second Lagrange point (L2)

Main telescope
- Name: ART-XC
- Type: Wolter-I
- Wavelengths: X-rays

The Astronomical Roentgen Telescope X-ray Concentrator (ART-XC) is an X-ray telescope with a grazing incidence mirror that is capable of capturing high energy X-ray photons within the 5-30 keV energy range. This telescope is one of the two X-ray telescopes on the Spektr-RG (SRG) mission. The other telescope that SRG carries is eROSITA. The observatory was launched on 13 July 2019 via a Proton rocket from the Russian launch site Baikonur in Kazakhstan.

== Overview ==
ART-XC was developed by the Space Research Institute (IKI) and the All-Russian Scientific Research Institute for Experimental Physics (VNIIEF). The NASA Marshall Space Flight Center (MSFC) has developed and fabricated flight models of the X-ray mirror systems. The ART-XC telescope consists of 7 identical mirror modules each made with 28 nickel-cobalt grazing-incidence mirrors. The mirror design is Wolter-I and is coated with iridium. Each module also has its own cadmium-tellurium double-sided strip detector. The typical on-axis half-power diameter of ART-XC is 27 to 34 arcsec, while the effective area of each module is 65 cm^{2} (both were estimated at 8 keV). The field of view for each module is about 36′ in diameter.

ART-XC will survey the entire sky every six months, and the planned all-sky survey will be completed in the first four years of the mission.

== First light ==
Roscosmos published the first light image of ART-XC, which was taken on July 30, 2019. The image shows the source Centaurus X-3 imaged with the 7 telescopes, as well as the light curve of the pulsar folded at its pulse period of 4.8s.

== Instruments ==
Instruments on the Spektr-RG observatory
	eROSITA	ART-XC
Organisation	Max Planck Institute for Extraterrestrial Physics	IKI / VNIIEF
Telescope type	Wolter	Wolter
Wavelength	X-ray	X-ray
Mass	810 kg	350 kg
Sensitivity range	0.3 - 10 keV	6 - 30 keV
View angle	1 degree	30 arcminutes
Angular resolution	15 arcseconds	45 arcseconds
Sensor area	2,400 cm^{2}/ 1 keV	450 cm^{2}/ 8 keV
