= EFEDSJ0828–0139 =

Hyperluminous quasar discovered by a Japanese team of astronomers, led by Yoshiki Toba (NAOJ), among the sources identified by eROSITA instrument, on board the Spektr-RG spacecraft. This quasar, emitting from Radio to X-ray, would have a redshift z=1.62. The mass of SMBH in the core of the host galaxy, would be pair to 620 million solar masses. By the research, the IR luminosity of this object would be 68 trillion solar luminosity, with an Eddington ratio of 3.6. Tha SFR would be as high as a thousand solar masses/yr. Toba and colleagues have used facilities at Seimei Telescope, and at the James Clerk Maxwell Telescope (JCMT) for this study.
