= PKS 1353−341 =

Compact quasar within a cluster; Centaurus

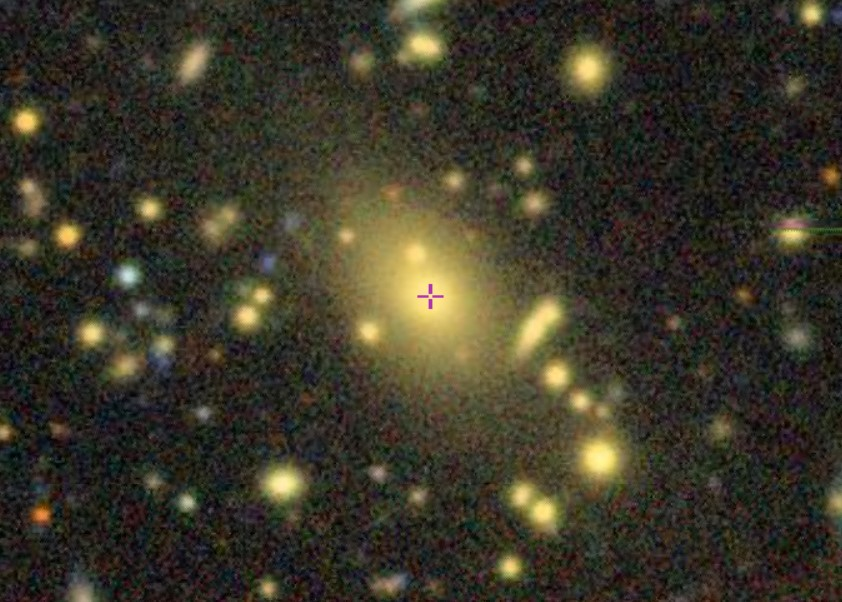
- PKS 1353-341 captured by DESI Legacy Surveys

Observation data (J2000.0 (ICRS) epoch)
- Constellation: Centaurus
- Right ascension: 13^{h} 56^{m} 05.38657^{s}
- Declination: −34° 21′ 10.8591″
- Redshift: 0.222928
- Heliocentric radial velocity: 59,531±23 km/s
- Distance: 3.7228 Gly (1.14141 Gpc)
- Group or cluster: PSZ2 G317.79+26.63
- Apparent magnitude (V): 18.5
- Apparent magnitude (B): 17.47
- Absolute magnitude (V): −22.4

Characteristics
- Type: Large elliptical galaxy + Quasar
- Mass: (30±1)×10^{10} M_{☉}
- Size: ~537,000 ly (164.6 kpc) (estimated)
- Apparent size (V): 0.267 × 0.144"

Other designations
- PGC 88936

PKS 1353−341, also known as LEDA 88936, is a quasar (99% chance) located in the southern constellation Centaurus. It has an apparent magnitude of 18.5, making it only visible in powerful telescopes. Based on the object's luminosity, it is estimated to be 3.7 billion light years distant from the Solar System. It is receding from the Milky Way with a heliocentric radial velocity of 66,854 km/s.

The object was first identified by R.A. Preston in 1985. Before then, it was unnoticed. Analysis in 1998 reveal that it might be relatively dusty based on the quasar's X-ray properties; Long thought to be solitary, the CHiPS (Clusters Hiding in Plain Sight) Survey found PSZ2 G317.79+26.63, a massive galaxy cluster surrounding the quasar. The team analyzed data from the 2MASS, NVSS, ROSAT, SUMSS, and WISE all-sky surveys in order to locate powerful sources of infrared, radio, and X-ray light. The goal was to discover new galaxy clusters that were previously misidentified as isolated sources of X-ray light due to the central quasar's brightness.

As an individual object, PKS 1353−341 has a central mass 300 billion times that of the Sun, which is 1/4 of the Milky Way's mass. It has an absolute magnitude of −22.4 in the blue passband, making it very luminous. The galaxy hosting PKS 1353−341 is a large elliptical galaxy. Typical of quasars, PKS 1353−341 has two jets originating from the center of the galaxy. When combined with the surrounding cluster, both have a mass of 6.9+3.4
−2.6×10^{14} M_{☉}, making it a thousand times more massive than our own galaxy.
