= EROSITA =

X-ray space telescope

eROSITA
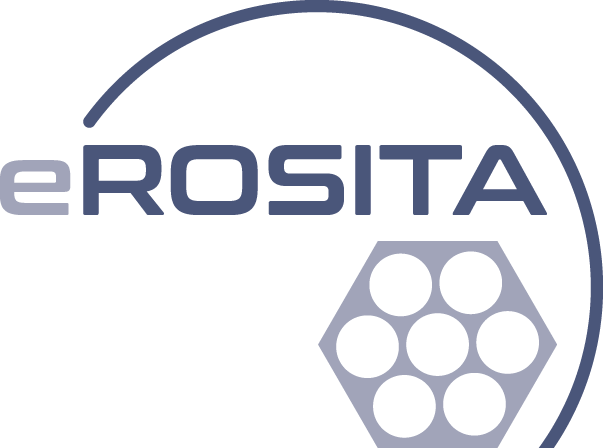
- Manufacturer: Max Planck Institute for Extraterrestrial Physics
- Instrument type: Wolter
- Function: X-ray all-sky survey
- Mission duration: > 7 years
- Website: www.mpe.mpg.de/eROSITA

Properties
- Mass: 810 kg (1,790 lb)
- Dimensions: 1.3 m × 2.6 m
- Number launched: 7 mirror modules
- Power consumption: 550 W
- Resolution: 15 arcsec (at 1.5 keV)
- Spectral band: X-rays, 0.2 - 10 keV (6.2-0.12 nm)

Host spacecraft
- Spacecraft: Spektr-RG
- Operator: Russia, Russian Space Research Institute; Germany, German Aerospace Center
- Launch date: 13 July 2019
- Rocket: Proton-M
- Launch site: Baikonur 81/24
- Orbit: Second Lagrange point (L2)

eROSITA is an X-ray instrument built by the Max Planck Institute for Extraterrestrial Physics (MPE) in Germany. It is part of the Russian–German Spektr-RG space observatory, which also carries the Russian telescope ART-XC. It was launched by Roscosmos on 13 July 2019 from Baikonur, and deployed in a 6-month halo orbit around the second Lagrange point (L2). It began collecting data in October 2019. Due to the breakdown of institutional cooperation between Germany and Russia after the invasion of Ukraine, the instrument stopped collecting data on February 26, 2022.

== Overview ==
eROSITA overview animation from the German Aerospace Center

eROSITA was originally designed by the ESA for the International Space Station, and it was concluded in 2005 that its accommodation on a dedicated free flyer would provide significantly improved scientific output. The eROSITA telescopes are based on the design of the ABRIXAS observatory launched in April 1999, whose battery was accidentally overcharged and destroyed three days after the mission started.

The plan was eROSITA imaging the entire sky in the X-ray band for seven years. The eROSITA all-sky survey (eRASS) was the first image of the entire sky in the 2-10 keV band. In the 0.3-2 keV band, it is expected to be 25 times more sensitive than the pioneering ROSAT mission of the 1990s, and will effectively supersede it. eROSITA is expected to detect 100,000 galaxy clusters, 3 million active galactic nuclei and 700,000 stars in the Milky Way. The primary science goal is to measure dark energy through the structure and history of the Universe traced by galaxy clusters.

eROSITA was launched on 13 July 2019 by Roscosmos from Baikonur. It achieved first light on 17 October 2019 and completed its first all-sky survey on 11 June 2020. In the summer of 2021 the first eROSITA X-ray data release to the public was announced. The operations of eROSITA were suspended on 26 February 2022 after the Russian attack into Ukraine. The science operations of the instrument were paused, but the analysis of the data already received in Germany continued. At the time, eROSITA had completed four of its planned eight full-sky surveys. In June 2022, Roscosmos announced its intent to restore the operation of eROSITA unilaterally, which was criticized by experts for its potential to damage the telescope.

== Construction ==
The telescope consists of seven identical Wolter-type mirror modules with 54 nested gold-coated mirrors. The mirrors are arranged to collect the high-energy X-ray photons and guide them to the eROSITA X-ray sensitive cameras. The cameras were also custom-built at MPE, with X-ray CCDs manufactured from high-purity silicon. For optimum performance, the cameras are cooled to −90 °C (−130 °F; 183 K).

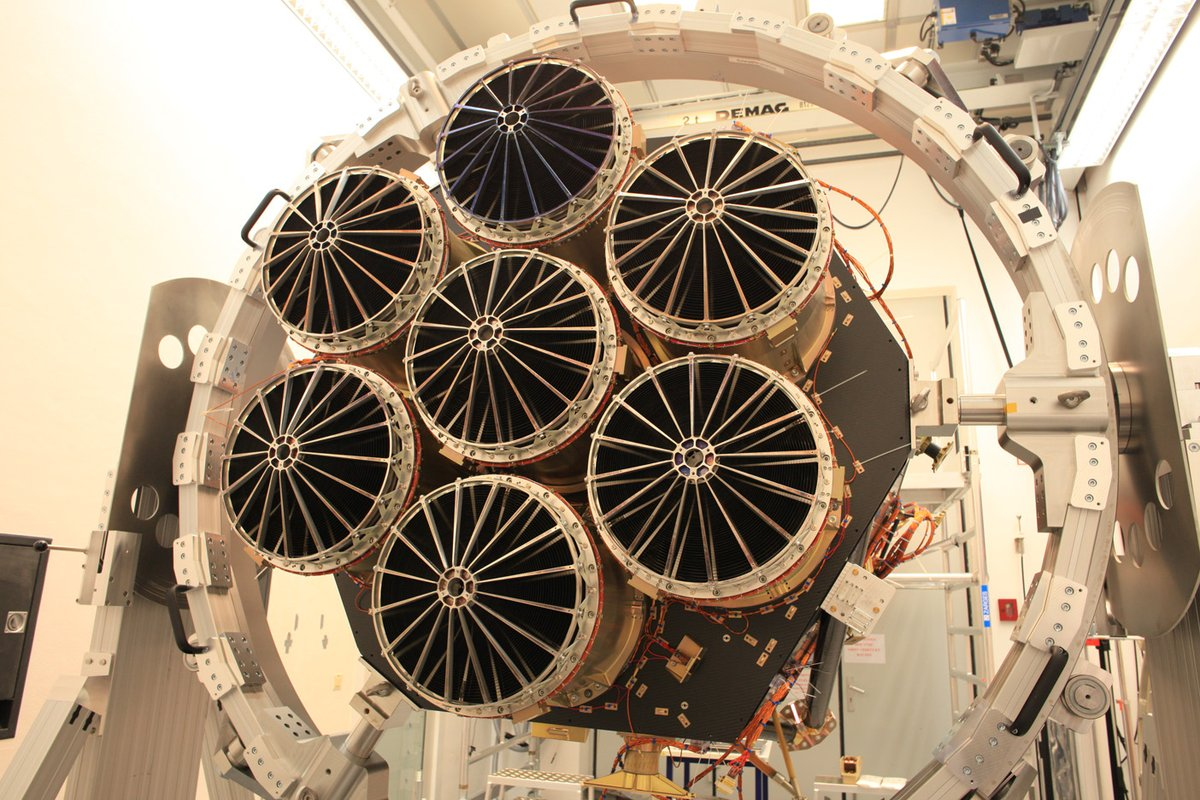
The seven mirror modules from the front

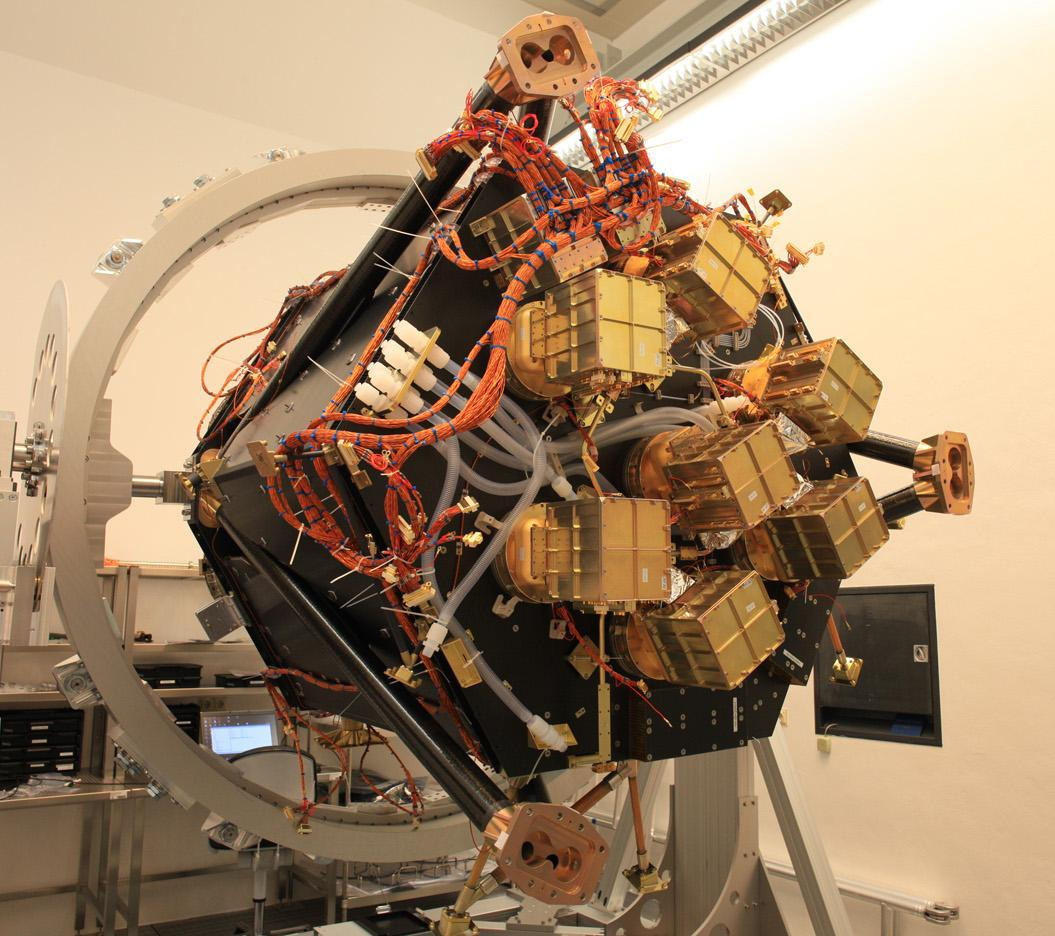
X-ray detectors behind each mirror

== Instruments ==
Instruments on the Spektr-RG observatory
	eROSITA	ART-XC
Organisation	Max Planck Institute for Extraterrestrial Physics	IKI / VNIIEF
Telescope type	Wolter	Wolter
Wavelength	X-ray	X-ray
Mass	810 kg	350 kg
Sensitivity range	0.3 - 10 keV	6 - 30 keV
View angle	1 degree (diameter)	30 minutes
Angular resolution	15 seconds	45 seconds
Sensor area	2,400 cm^{2}/ 1 keV	450 cm^{2}/ 8 keV

== Collaboration ==
eROSITA was developed at the Max Planck Institute for Extraterrestrial Physics in collaboration with institutes in Bamberg, Hamburg, Potsdam und Tübingen. The instrument principal investigator is Peter Predehl. The project scientist is Andrea Merloni. The German eROSITA consortium has members from institutes all across Germany, but also from international institutes, and has established collaborations with ground-based telescopes for follow-up observations of the millions of sources that will be detected by eROSITA.

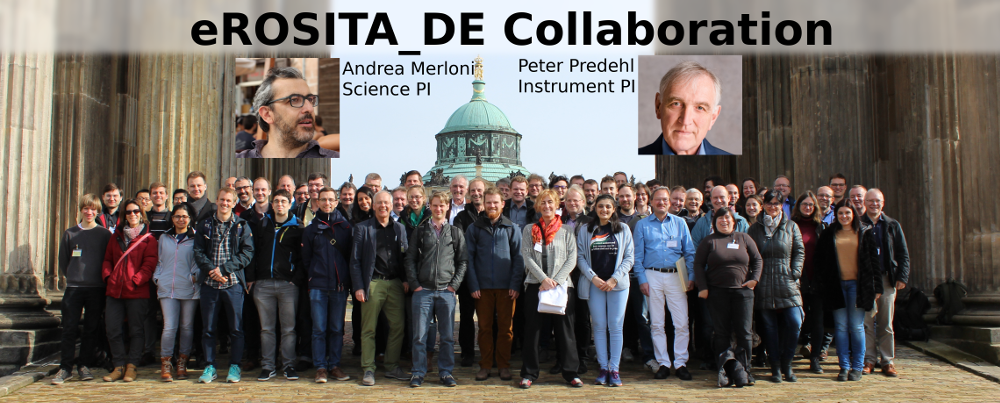
German eROSITA consortium meeting in Potsdam, March 4–7, 2019

== Science results ==
First science verification results were released on October 22, 2019, including high-resolution spectra of Supernova 1987a, images of the Large Magellanic Cloud and galaxy clusters, as well as light curves of a highly variable Active Galactic Nuclei.

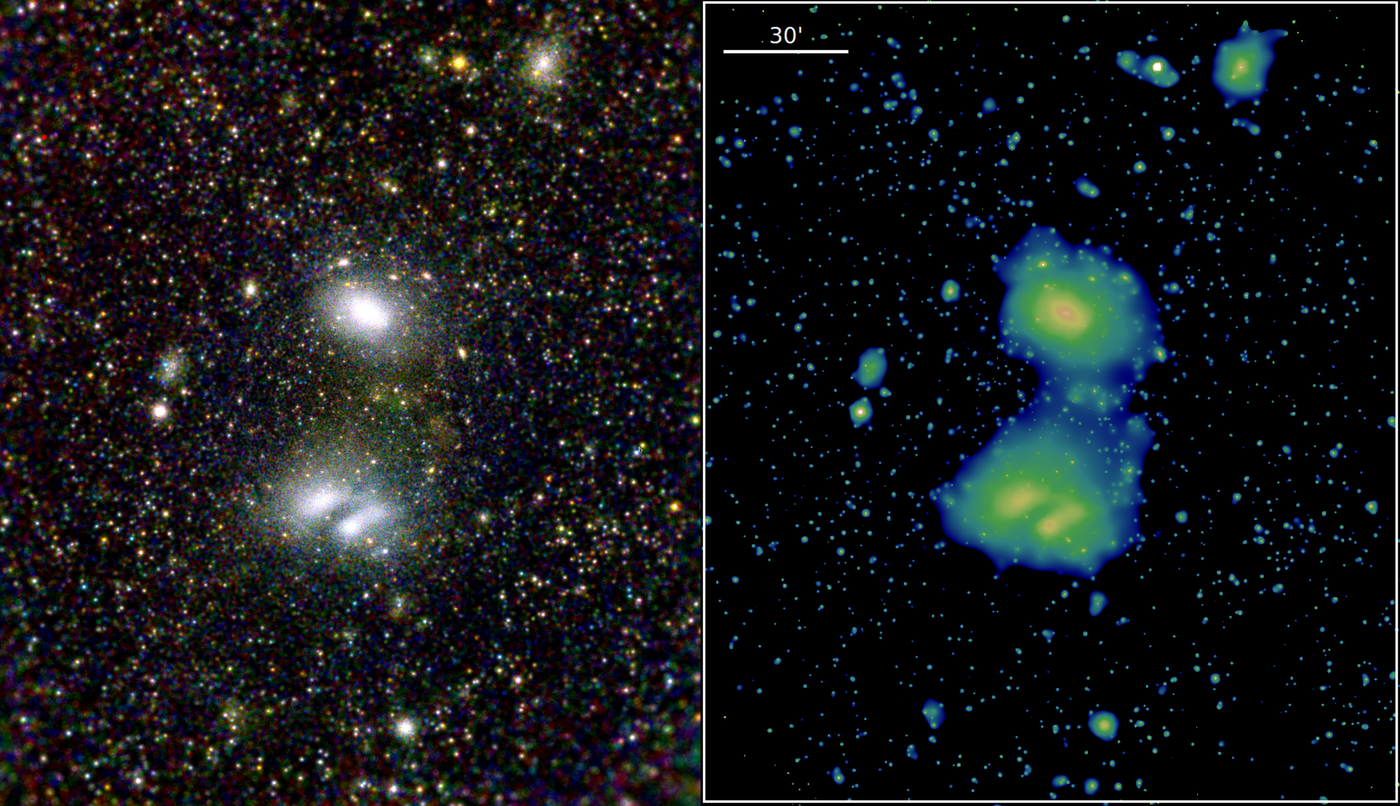
Interacting galaxy clusters A3391 & A3395 with eROSITA

The first all-sky survey was completed on June 11, 2020, cataloging 1.1 million sources, including mostly Active Galactic Nuclei (77%), stars with strong, magnetically active hot coronae (20%) and clusters of galaxies (2%), but also bright X-ray binaries, supernova remnants, extended star-forming regions as well as transients such as Gamma-Ray Bursts. The map includes extended features of the Milky Way, including mushroom-like bubbles and absorbing galactic gas in the disk (blue).

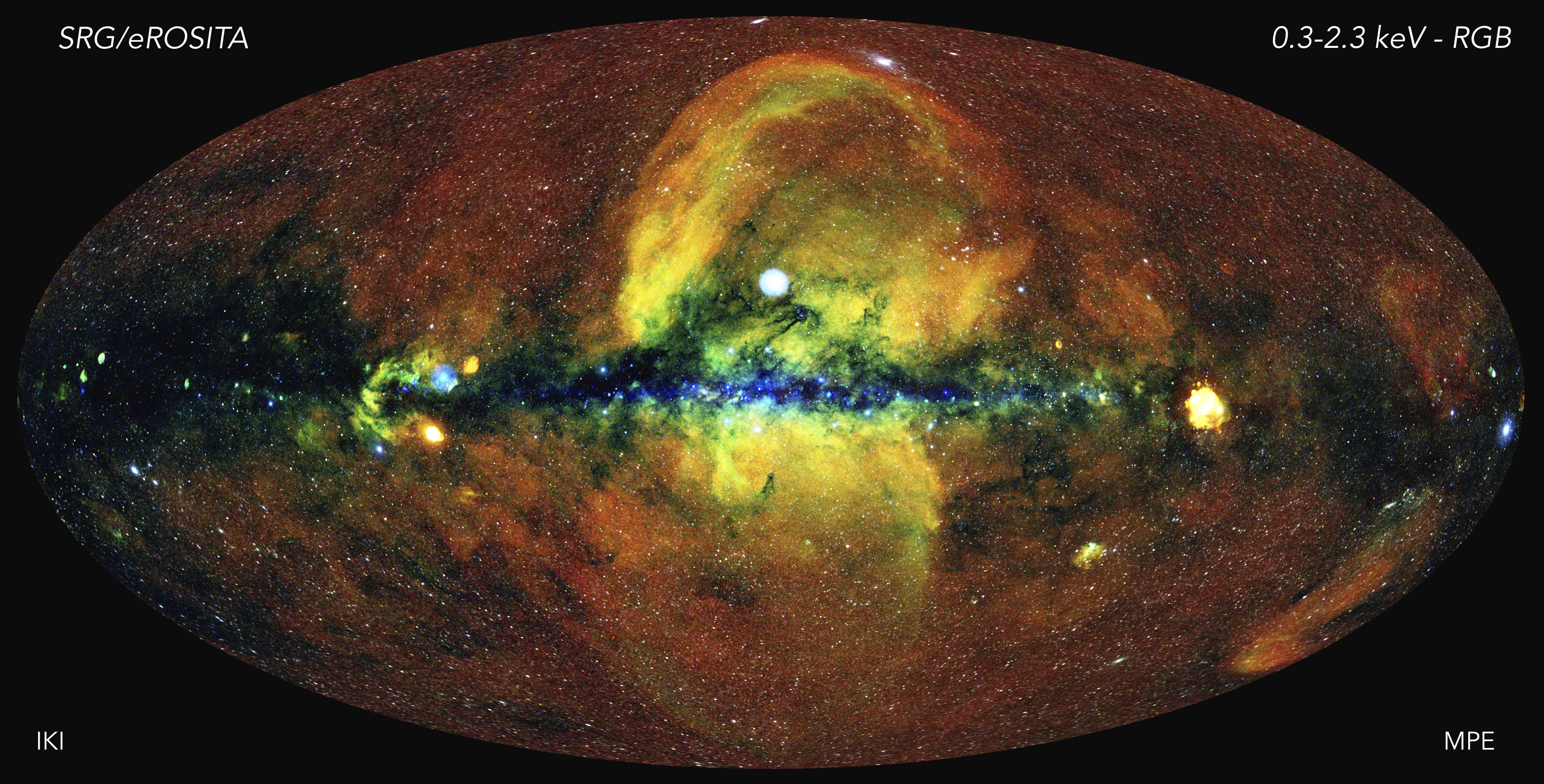
eROSITA all-sky survey image

== See also ==
- Fermi Gamma-ray Space Telescope
