= RTT-150 =

Russian-Turkish 1.5-m optical telescope

Coordinates: 36°49′30″N 30°20′10″E

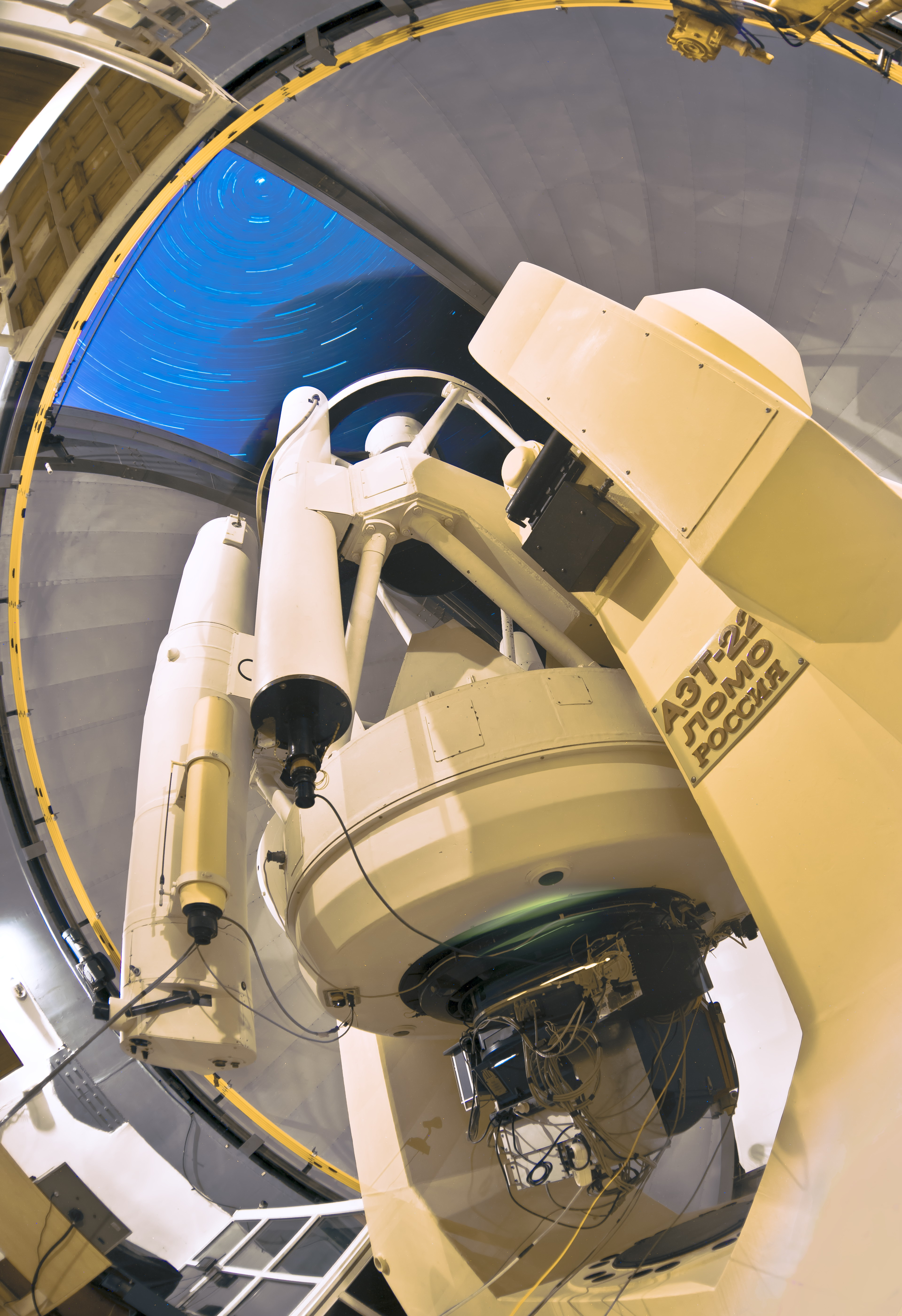

RTT-150 (Russian: РТТ-150) is a Russian-Turkish 1.5-m optical telescope. It is an international project, jointly led by the Ministry of Education and Science of the Russian Federation and the Council for Technical and Scientific Research of Turkey (TÜBİTAK, TUBITAK). The main performers are Kazan Federal University and the Space Research Institute of the Russian Academy of Sciences from the Russian side and the TUBITAK State Observatory (TUG; observatory code “A84”) from Turkey. Observational time of the telescope is shared in the following proportion: 45% - KSU, 15% - IKI RAS (accordance with agreement between parties), and another 40% - are shared between Turkish universities through the TUG.

One of the main tasks of the telescope is the optical support of orbital X-ray observatories: INTEGRAL observatory and Spektr-RG.
