= Robert Lin =

American astrophysicist

- Born: Robert Peichung Lin; January 24, 1942; Guangxi, China
- Died: November 17, 2012 (aged 70); Berkeley, California, U.S.

Academic background
- Education: California Institute of Technology (BS); University of California, Berkeley (PhD)

Academic work
- Discipline: Physics
- Sub-discipline: Astrophysics
- Institutions: Space Sciences Laboratory

Robert Peichung Lin (Chinese: 林伯中; pinyin: Lín Bózhōng; January 24, 1942 – November 17, 2012) was a Chinese-born American astrophysicist. He was a professor and director of the Space Sciences Laboratory (1998–2008) at the University of California, Berkeley. As a pioneer of gamma-ray astronomy and of particle detection in space, his research was fundamental to the development of our knowledge in solar physics, the physics of the solar wind and of the magnetosphere. He was the principal investigator for the Reuven Ramaty High Energy Solar Spectroscopic Imager.

== Early life and education ==
Robert Lin was the son of Tung Hua Lin. He was born in Guangxi, China on January 24, 1942, and moved to London as a child and then to Michigan. He earned a Bachelor of Science degree in physics from the California Institute of Technology in 1962 and a Ph.D. from the University of California, Berkeley in 1967.

== Career ==
Lin remained at his PhD institution, the University of California, Berkeley, for his entire career, and was a main contributor to the success of its Space Sciences Laboratory, becoming its director.

His research focused on experimental space physics and high-energy astrophysics. He made major contributions to topics involving solar flares, plasma phenomena in the Earth's magnetosphere, lunar and planetary geology, heliospheric physics, and high-energy astrophysics. In 2006, Lin was elected to the National Academy of Sciences for his contributions to the "behavior of electrons and ions accelerated by the sun, and detected the accompanying x-ray and gamma-ray emissions."

== Personal life ==
Lin suffered a sudden stroke on November 17, 2012, and died at Alta Bates Medical Center, aged 70.
