= Modified Uniformly Redundant Array =

A modified uniformly redundant array (MURA) is a type of mask used in coded aperture imaging. They were first proposed by Gottesman and Fenimore in 1989.

== Mathematical Construction of MURAs ==
MURAs can be generated in any length L that is prime and of the form

$$L =  4m +1, \ \  m = 1,2,3,...,$$

the first five such values being $L = 5,13,17,29,37$. The binary sequence of a linear MURA is given by $A = {A_i}_{i=0}^{L-1}$, where

$$A_i = \begin{cases}
0  & \mbox{if } i = 0, \\
1  & \mbox{if } i \mbox{ is a quadratic residue modulo } L, i \neq 0,\\
0   & \mbox{otherwise}
\end{cases}$$

These linear MURA arrays can also be arranged to form hexagonal MURA arrays. One may note that if $L = 4m + 3$ and $A_0 = 1$, a uniformly redundant array(URA) is a generated.

As with any mask in coded aperture imaging, an inverse sequence must also be constructed. In the MURA case, this inverse G can be constructed easily given the original coding pattern A:

$$G_i = \begin{cases}
+1   & \mbox{if } i = 0, \\
+1  & \mbox{if } A_i = 1, i \neq 0,\\
-1  & \mbox{if } A_i = 0, i \neq 0,
\end{cases}$$

Rectangular MURA arrays are constructed in a slightly different manner, letting $A = \{A_{ij}\}_ {i,j =0}^{p-1}$, where

$$A_{ij} = \begin{cases}
0 & \mbox{if } i = 0, \\
1 & \mbox{if } j = 0, i \neq 0, \\
1 & \mbox{if } C_i C_j = +1, \\
0  & \mbox{otherwise,}
\end{cases}$$

and

$$C_i  = \begin{cases}
+1 & \mbox{if } i \mbox{ is a quadratic residue modulo }p, \\
- 1 & \mbox{otherwise,}
\end{cases}$$

A rectangular MURA mask of size 101

The corresponding decoding function G is constructed as follows:

$$G_{ij} = \begin{cases}
+1 & \mbox{if } i + j = 0; \\
+1 & \mbox{if } A_{ij} = 1,  \ (i+j \neq 0); \\
-1 & \mbox{if } A_{ij} = 0, \ (i+j \neq 0),;
\end{cases}$$
