= Spektr-RG =

Russian–German observatory satellite

Spektr-RG Спектр-РГ
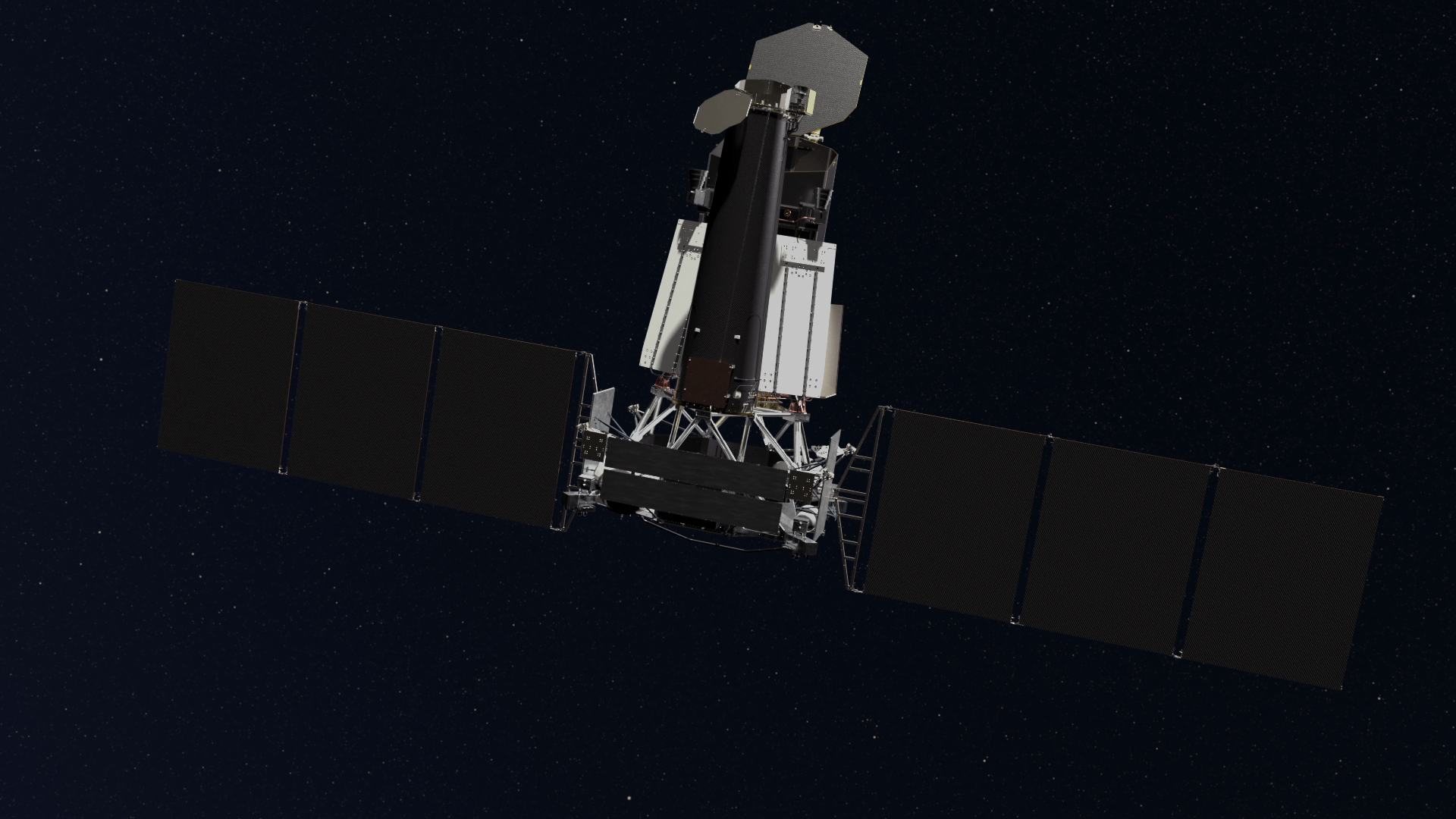
- Artist's impression of the deployed Spektr-RG
- Names: 2020 XA_{1} (Note: Spektr-RG was initially mistaken for a near-Earth asteroid by the Catalina Sky Survey until its identity as a spacecraft was confirmed.)
- Mission type: X-ray astronomy
- Operator: Russian Space Research Institute, German Aerospace Center
- COSPAR ID: 2019-040A
- SATCAT no.: 44432
- Website: srg.iki.rssi.ru
- Mission duration: Planned: 6.5 years Elapsed: 7 years, 4 months, 6 days

Spacecraft properties
- Bus: Navigator
- Manufacturer: NPO Lavochkin, Max Planck Institute for Extraterrestrial Physics
- Launch mass: 2,712 kg (5,979 lb)
- Payload mass: 1,210 kg (2,670 lb)
- Power: 1.8 kW

Start of mission
- Launch date: 13 July 2019, 12:31 UTC
- Rocket: Proton-M
- Launch site: Baikonur Site 81/24

Orbital parameters
- Reference system: Sun–Earth L_{2}
- Regime: Halo orbit

Main telescope
- Type: eROSITA: Wolter
- Wavelengths: X-ray

Instruments
- eROSITA, ART-XC

Spektr-RG (Russian: Спектр-РГ, Spectrum + Röntgen + Gamma; also called Spectrum-X-Gamma, SRG, SXG) is a Russian–German high-energy astrophysics space observatory which was launched on 13 July 2019. It follows on from the Spektr-R satellite telescope launched in 2011.

== Background ==
The original idea for this X-ray observatory satellite orbiting above Earth's atmosphere, which filters X-rays, was first proposed in the 1980s by Rashid Sunyaev of the Space Research Institute of the USSR Academy of Sciences. Twenty institutions from twelve countries came together to design a large observatory with five telescopes. However, after the collapse of the Soviet Union, the mission was abandoned due to cost-cutting from the Russian space program Roscosmos. The project was resurrected in 2003 with a scaled-down design.

== Overview ==
eROSITA overview animation from the German Aerospace Center showing the Spektr-RG mission profile

The primary instrument of the mission is eROSITA, built by the Max Planck Institute for Extraterrestrial Physics (MPE) in Germany. It is designed to conduct a seven-year X-ray survey, the first in the medium X-ray band less than 10 keV energies, and the first to map an estimated 100,000 galaxy clusters. This survey may detect new clusters of galaxies and active galactic nuclei. The second instrument, ART-XC, is a Russian high-energy X-ray telescope capable of detecting supermassive black holes.

== Spacecraft ==
The Spektr-RG mission concept was published in 2005. Construction was finished in 2016, and by mid-2018 it was under integration and testing. It was scheduled to be launched in June 2019 but was delayed to 12 July, before the flight was postponed at the last moment. It launched the next day, 13 July 2019, from Baikonur Site 81/24. The observatory was integrated into a Navigator satellite bus, produced by NPO Lavochkin.

== Mission profile and orbit ==
The spacecraft entered an orbit around the Sun, circling the Sun-Earth L_{2} Lagrangian point in a halo orbit, about 1.5 million kilometres away from Earth. Cruise to that location took three months, during which the two telescopes were checked out and calibrated. The next four years were planned to be spent performing eight all-sky surveys. As a goal, the three years after that are planned for observations of selected galaxy clusters and AGNs (Active Galactic Nuclei).

On Monday 21 October 2019, Spektr-RG completed a 100-day cruise to L2-point. On 17 October 2019, the main eROSITA instrument achieved first light. The first light image of ART-XC was taken on July 30, 2019.

The operations of eROSITA were suspended on 26 February 2022 after the Russian invasion into Ukraine upon request from Germany. At the time, eROSITA had completed four of its planned eight full-sky surveys.

In March 2022, Russia said they turned off one of the two telescopes aboard Spektr-RG (presumably eROSITA) upon request from Germany. In June, Dmitry Rogozin, the head of Roscosmos, said he planned to unilaterally seize control of the German telescope, saying German officials' "don't have a moral right to halt this research for humankind" and that they had "pro-fascist views". However Russian astrophysicist Rashid Sunyaev said doing so could damage the instrument and would add to mistrust.

In 2023 it was published that Spektr-RG found 17 new AGNs. In 2025 it was published that Spektr-RG found additional 11 new AGNs.

== Instruments ==
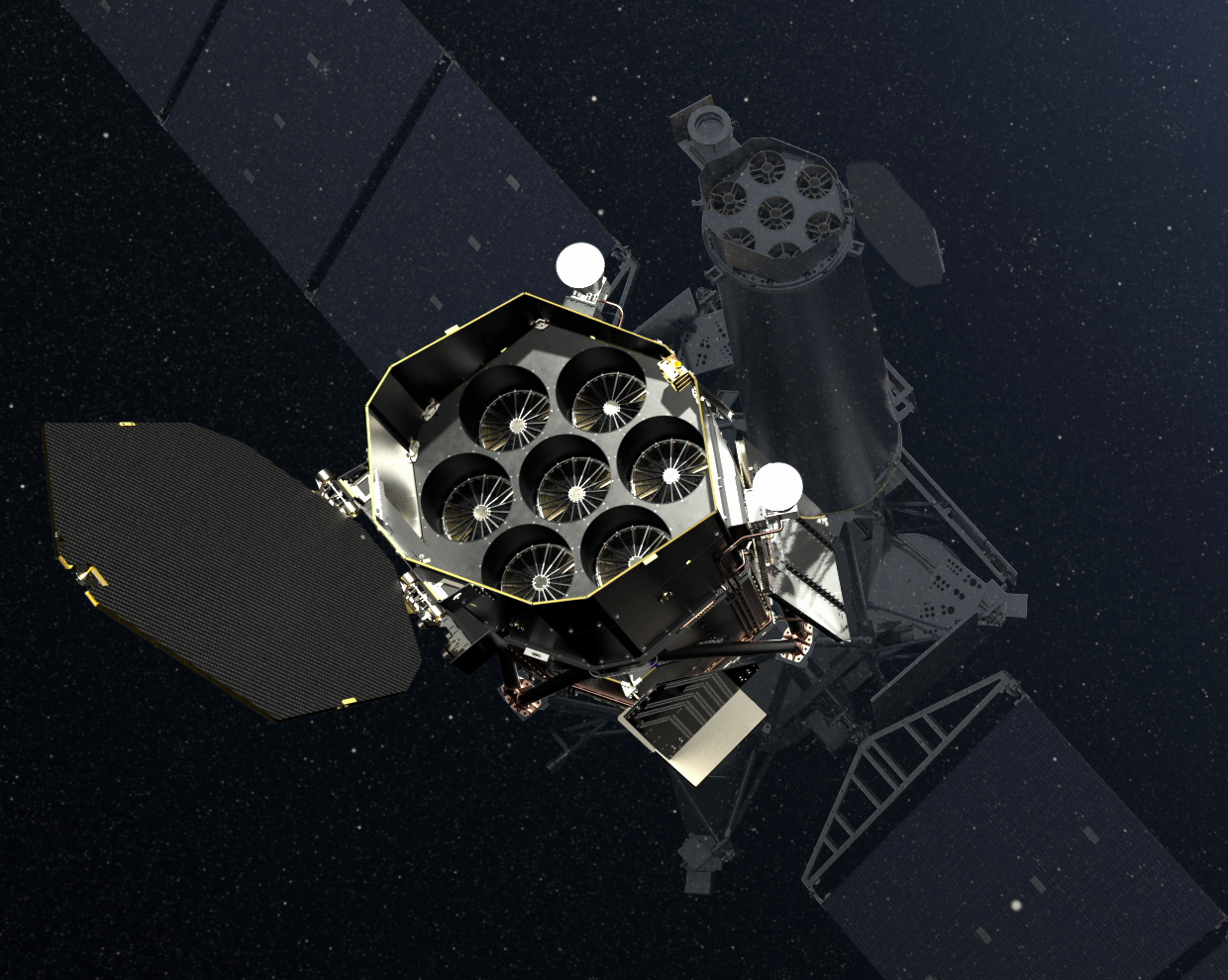
Spektr-RG instruments. eROSITA is the larger mirrors on the bottom left and ART-XC is the smaller mirrors on the top right.

Instruments on the Spektr-RG observatory
	eROSITA	ART-XC
Organisation	MPE	IKI / VNIIEF
Telescope type	Wolter	Wolter
Wavelength	X-ray	X-ray
Mass	810 kg	350 kg
Sensitivity range	0.3–10 keV	4–30 keV
Field of view	1 degree	30 arcminutes
Angular resolution	15 arcseconds	45 arcseconds
Sensor area	2,400 cm^{2} at 1 keV	450 cm^{2} at 8 keV

== Optical mission support ==
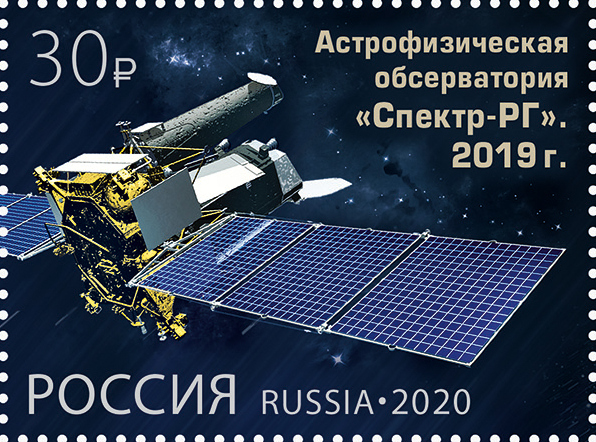
Spektr-RG on a 2020 stamp of Russia

=== Russian ===
- BTA-6
- Caucasus Mountain Observatory
- RTT-150
- Sayan Solar Observatory
- International Scientific Optical Network

=== German ===
- Las Campanas Observatory
- Cerro Tololo Inter-American Observatory
- Paranal Observatory
- La Silla Observatory

== See also ==
- IXPE—a high-resolution X-ray telescope measuring polarization of X-rays
- XPoSat— complimentary X-ray telescope
- List of X-ray space telescopes
- ROSAT—observed at similar X-ray energies in the 1990s
- TAUVEX—an instrument originally planned for Spektr-RG; it was built but never flown
