= Hans Wolter =

Hans Wolter (11 May 1911 in Dramburg – 17 August 1978 in Marburg) was a German physicist who designed an aplanatic system of grazing incidence mirrors that satisfied the Abbe sine condition (i.e. free of both spherical aberration and coma). Wolter showed such a system could be produced using a combination of a paraboloid with either a hyperboloid or ellipsoid secondary. The three simplest designs are outlined and are known as Wolter telescopes of types I, II and III.
