= ROSAT =

Satellite X-ray telescope

Röntgensatellit
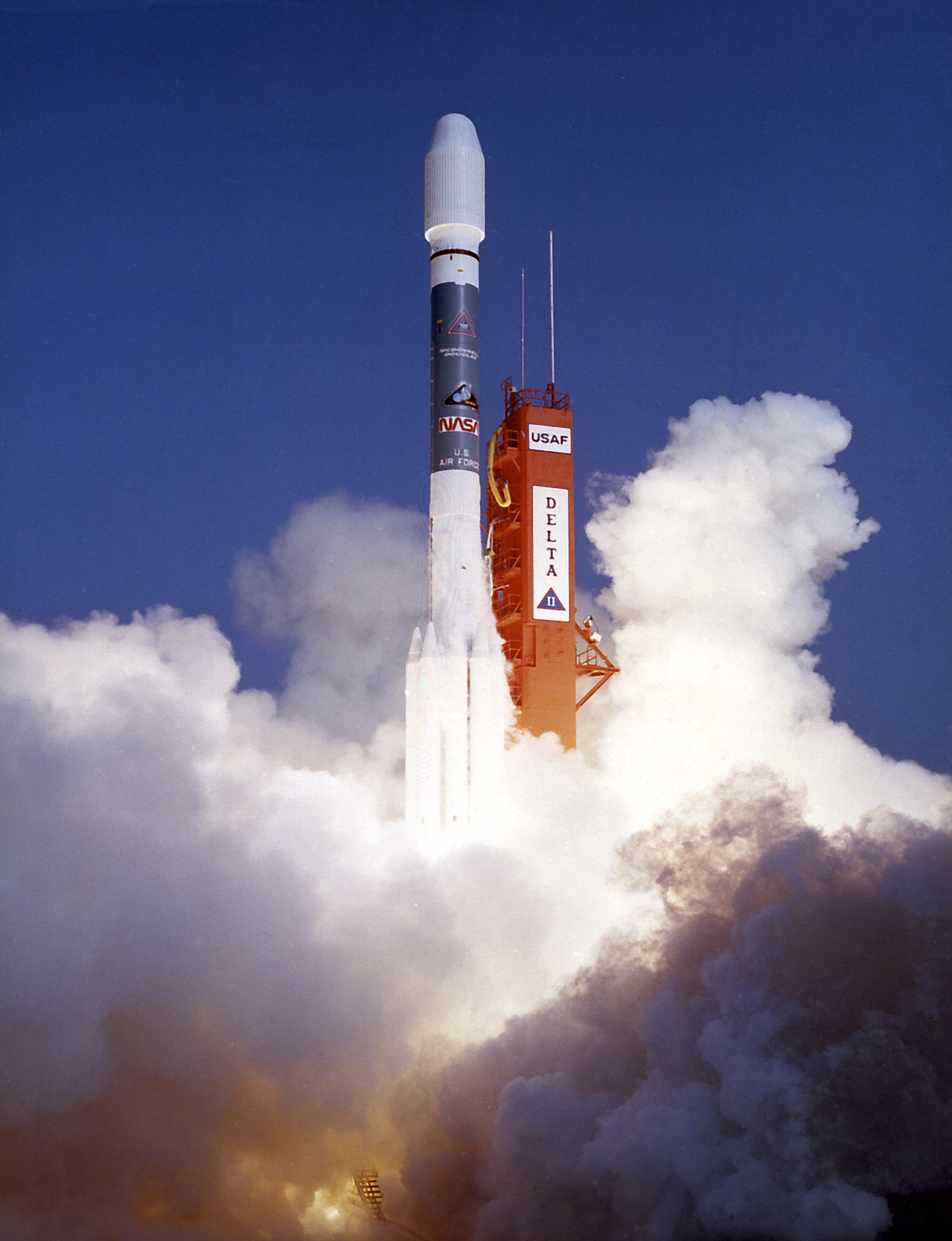
- Launch of the ROSAT in Cape Canaveral, Florida.
- Names: ROSAT
- Mission type: Space Telescope
- Operator: DLR / NASA
- COSPAR ID: 1990-049A
- SATCAT no.: 20638
- Website: www.dlr.de/en/rosat
- Mission duration: 8 years and 8 months

Spacecraft properties
- Launch mass: 2,421 kilograms (5,337 lb)

Start of mission
- Launch date: 21:48, 1 June 1990 (UTC)
- Rocket: Delta II 6920-10
- Launch site: Cape Canaveral LC-17A

End of mission
- Deactivated: 12 February 1999
- Decay date: 23:00, 23 October 2011 (UTC)

Orbital parameters
- Reference system: Geocentric
- Eccentricity: 0
- Perigee altitude: 580 km (360 mi)
- Apogee altitude: 580 km (360 mi)
- Inclination: 53°
- Period: 96 min
- Epoch: 1990-06-01

Main telescope
- Type: Wolter I
- Diameter: 84 centimetres (33 in)
- Focal length: 240 centimetres (94 in)
- Wavelengths: 30-0.06 nm, X-rays and Extreme Ultraviolet
- Resolution: 5 arc-s at half energy width

Instruments
- Position Sensitive Proportional Counter; Wide Field Camera; High Resolution Imager

ROSAT (short for Röntgensatellit; in German X-rays are called Röntgenstrahlen, in honour of Wilhelm Röntgen) was a German Aerospace Center-led satellite X-ray telescope, with instruments built by West Germany, the United Kingdom and the United States. It was launched on 1 June 1990, on a Delta II rocket from Cape Canaveral, Florida, on what was initially designed as an 18-month mission, with provision for up to five years of operation. ROSAT operated for over eight years, shutting down on 12 February 1999.

In February 2011, it was reported that the 2,400 kg (5,291 lb) satellite was unlikely to burn up entirely while re-entering the Earth's atmosphere due to the large amount of ceramics and glass used in construction. Parts as heavy as 400 kg (882 lb) could impact the Earth's surface. ROSAT eventually re-entered the Earth's atmosphere on 23 October 2011 over the Bay of Bengal.

== Overview ==
The Roentgensatellit (ROSAT) was a joint German, U.S. and British X-ray astrophysics project. ROSAT carried a German-built imaging X-ray Telescope (XRT) with three focal plane instruments: two German Position Sensitive Proportional Counters (PSPC) and the US-supplied High Resolution Imager (HRI). The X-ray mirror assembly was a grazing incidence four-fold nested Wolter I telescope with an 84-cm diameter aperture and 240-cm focal length. The angular resolution was less than 5 arcsecond at half energy width (the "angle within which half of the electromagnetic radiation" is focused). The XRT assembly was sensitive to X-rays between 0.1 and 2 keV (one thousand Electronvolts).

In addition, a British-supplied extreme ultraviolet (XUV) telescope, the Wide Field Camera (WFC), was coaligned with the XRT and covered the energy band from 0.042 to 0.21 keV (30 to 6 nm).

ROSAT's unique strengths were high spatial resolution, low-background, soft X-ray imaging for the study of the structure of low surface brightness features, and for low-resolution spectroscopy.

The ROSAT spacecraft was a three-axis stabilized satellite which can be used for pointed observations, for slewing between targets, and for performing scanning observations on great circles perpendicular to the plane of the ecliptic. ROSAT was capable of fast slews (180 deg. in ~15 min.) which made it possible to observe two targets on opposite hemispheres during each orbit. The pointing accuracy was 1 arcminute with stability less than 5 arcsec per sec and jitter radius of ~10 arcsec. Two CCD star sensors were used for optical position sensing of guide stars and attitude determination of the spacecraft. The post facto attitude determination accuracy was 6 arcsec.

The ROSAT mission was divided into two phases:

1. After a two-month on-orbit calibration and verification period, an all-sky survey was performed for six months using the PSPC in the focus of XRT, and in two XUV bands using the WFC. The survey was carried out in the scan mode.
2. The second phase consisted of the remainder of the mission and was devoted to pointed observations of selected astrophysical sources. In ROSAT's pointed phase, observing time was allocated to Guest Investigators from all three participating countries through peer review of submitted proposals. ROSAT had a design life of 18 months, but was expected to operate beyond its nominal lifetime.

== Instruments ==
=== X-ray Telescope (XRT) ===
The main assembly was a German-built imaging X-ray Telescope (XRT) with three focal plane instruments: two German Position Sensitive Proportional Counters (PSPC) and the US-supplied High Resolution Imager (HRI). The X-ray mirror assembly was a grazing incidence four-fold nested Wolter I telescope with an 84 cm (33 in) diameter aperture and 240 cm (94 in) focal length. The angular resolution was less than 5 arcsec at half energy width. The XRT assembly was sensitive to X-rays between 0.1 and 2 keV.

=== Position Sensitive Proportional Counters (two) (PSPC) ===
There are two Position Sensitive Proportional Counters (PSPC), PSPC-B and PSPC-C, mounted on a carousel within the focal plane turret of ROSAT. PSPC-C was intended to be the primary detector for the mission and was used for the bulk of the All-Sky Survey until it was destroyed during the AMCS glitch on 25 January 1991. After the glitch, PSPC-B was used for all further observations. Two more PSPCs (PSPC-A and PSPC-D) were mounted on ROSAT for ground calibration.

Each PSPC was a thin-window gas counter. Each incoming X-ray photon produced an electron cloud whose position and charge were detected using two wire grids. The photon position was determined with an accuracy of about 120 micrometers. The electron cloud's charge corresponded to the photon energy, with a nominal spectral bandpass 0.1-2.4 keV.

=== High Resolution Imager (HRI) ===
The US-supplied High Resolution Imager used a crossed grid detector with a position accuracy to 25 micrometers. The instrument was damaged by solar exposure on 20 September 1998.

=== Wide Field Camera (WFC) ===
The Wide Field Camera (WFC) was a UK-supplied extreme ultraviolet (XUV) telescope co-aligned with the XRT and covered the wave band between 300 and 60 angstroms (0.042 to 0.21 keV).

== Highlights ==
Earth's Moon on 29 June 1990 by ROSAT

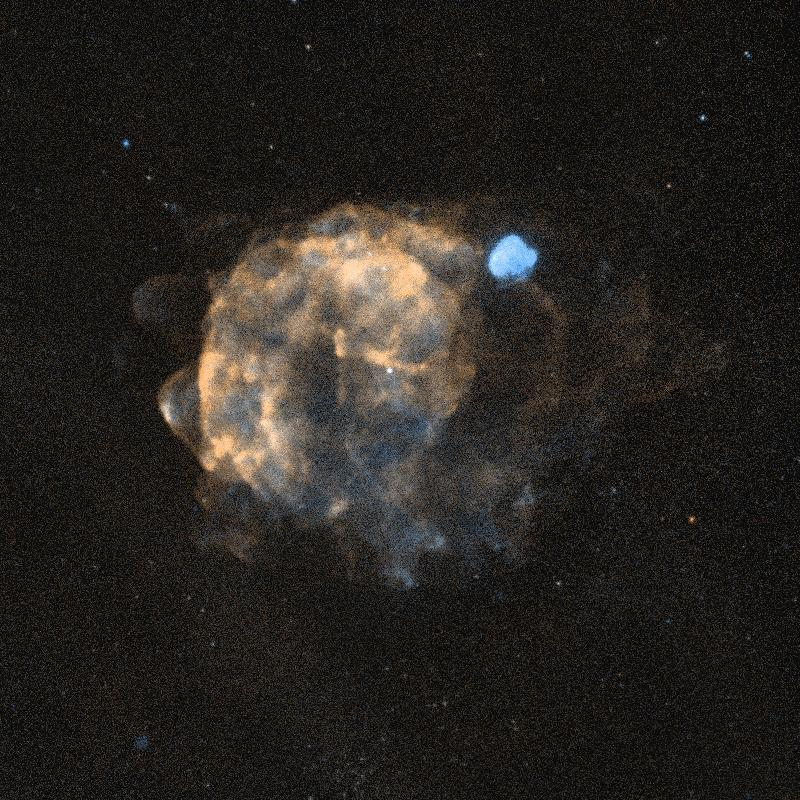
Vela Supernova Remnant, imaged by ROSAT

- X-ray all-sky survey catalog, more than 150,000 objects.
- XUV all-sky survey catalog (479 objects).
- Source catalogs from the pointed phase (PSPC and HRI) containing ~ 100,000 serendipitous sources.
- Detailed morphology of supernova remnants and clusters of galaxies.
- Detection of shadowing of diffuse X-ray emission by molecular clouds.
- Detection of pulsations from Geminga.
- Detection of isolated neutron stars.
- Discovery of X-ray emission from comets.
- Observation of X-ray emission from the collision of Comet Shoemaker-Levy with Jupiter.

=== Catalogues ===
- 1RXS – an acronym which is the prefix used for the First ROSAT X-ray Survey (1st ROSAT X-ray Survey), a catalogue of astronomical objects visible for ROSAT in the X-ray spectrum.

== See also ==
- Category:ROSAT objects

== Launch ==
ROSAT was originally planned to be launched on the Space Shuttle but the Challenger disaster caused it to be moved to the Delta platform. This move made it impossible to recapture ROSAT with a Shuttle and bring it back to Earth.

== End of operations ==
Originally designed for a five-year mission, ROSAT continued in its extended mission for a further four years before equipment failure forced an end to the mission. For some months after this, ROSAT completed its very last observations before being switched off on 12 February 1999.

On 25 April 1998, failure of the primary star tracker on the X-ray Telescope led to pointing errors that in turn caused solar overheating. A contingency plan and the necessary software had already been developed to use an alternative star tracker attached to the Wide Field Camera.

ROSAT was soon operational again, but with some restrictions to the effectiveness of its tracking and thus its control. It was severely damaged on 20 September 1998 when a reaction wheel in the spacecraft's Attitude Measuring and Control System reached its maximum rotational speed, (Note: A reaction wheel operates by changing its rotational velocity, conservation of angular momentum then causing the more massive satellite to rotate in opposition. Their maximum speed is limited by design, which in turn means they are limited in the rotational velocity they can impart to a satellite. "Reaching maximum speed" means merely that it cannot impart any more velocity change, not that it is approaching mechanical damage to itself.) losing control of a slew, damaging the High Resolution Imager by exposure to the sun. This failure was initially attributed to the difficulties of controlling the satellite under these difficult circumstances outside its initial design parameters.

=== Allegations of cyber-attacks causing the failure ===
In 2008, NASA investigators were reported to have found that the ROSAT failure was linked to a cyber-intrusion at Goddard Space Flight Center. The root of this allegation is a 1999 advisory report by Thomas Talleur, senior investigator for cyber-security at NASA. This advisory is reported to describe a series of attacks from Russia that reached computers in the X-ray Astrophysics Section (i.e. ROSAT's) at Goddard, and took control of computers used for the control of satellites, not just a passive "snooping" attack. The advisory stated:

"Hostile activities compromised [NASA] computer systems that directly and indirectly deal with the design, testing, and transferring of satellite package command-and-control codes."

The advisory is further reported as claiming that the ROSAT incident was "coincident with the intrusion" and that, "Operational characteristics and commanding of the ROSAT were sufficiently similar to other space assets to provide intruders with valuable information about how such platforms are commanded". Without public access to the advisory, it is impossible to comment in detail. Even if it did describe a real intrusion, there is a plausible "no attack" explanation for ROSAT's failure, and the report is claimed to link the two incidents as no more than "coincident." However, NASA officials in charge of the day-to-day operations of the ROSAT mission at Goddard, including GSFC Rosat Project Scientist Rob Petre, say definitively that no such incident occurred. Talleur's information appears to have come from one of his interns who exaggerated a hacking incident on an office computer not related to flight operations.

IT security remains an issue for NASA. Other systems including the Earth Observing System have also been attacked.

== Re-entry ==
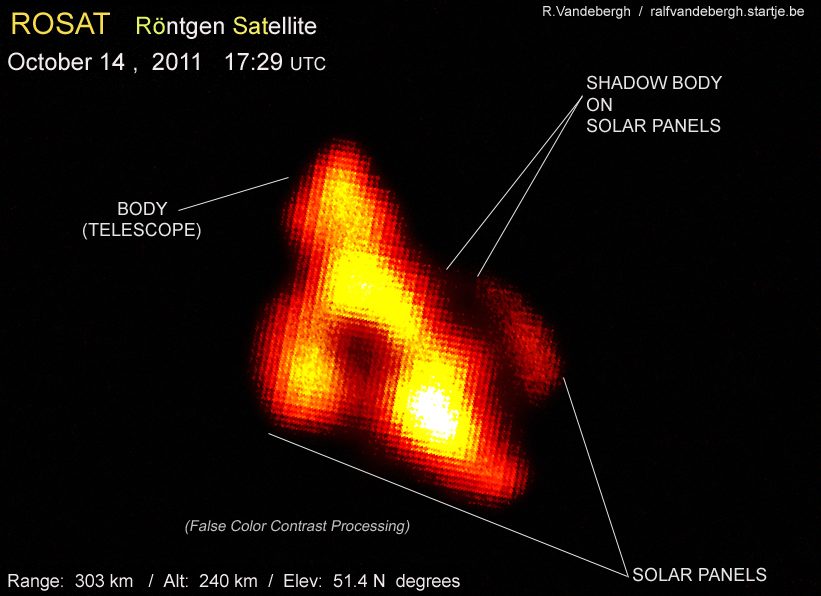
ROSAT: one of the last images of ROSAT before reentry

In 1990, the satellite was put in an orbit at an altitude of 580 km (360 mi) and inclination of 53°. Due to atmospheric drag, the satellite slowly lost height until, in September 2011, the satellite was orbiting approximately 270 km (168 mi) above the Earth. On 23 October 2011 ROSAT re-entered the Earth's atmosphere sometime between 1:45 UTC and 2:15 UTC over the Bay of Bengal, east of India. There was no confirmation if pieces of debris had reached the Earth's surface.

== Successor ==
eROSITA launched on board the Russian-German Spektr-RG space observatory in 2019. It was expected to provide an updated all-sky survey of the X-ray sky, extending the energy range to 10keV, increase the sensitivity by a factor of 25 and improve spatial and spectral resolution.

== See also ==
- List of X-ray space telescopes
