= Coded aperture =

Imaging technology for x-ray or gamma sources

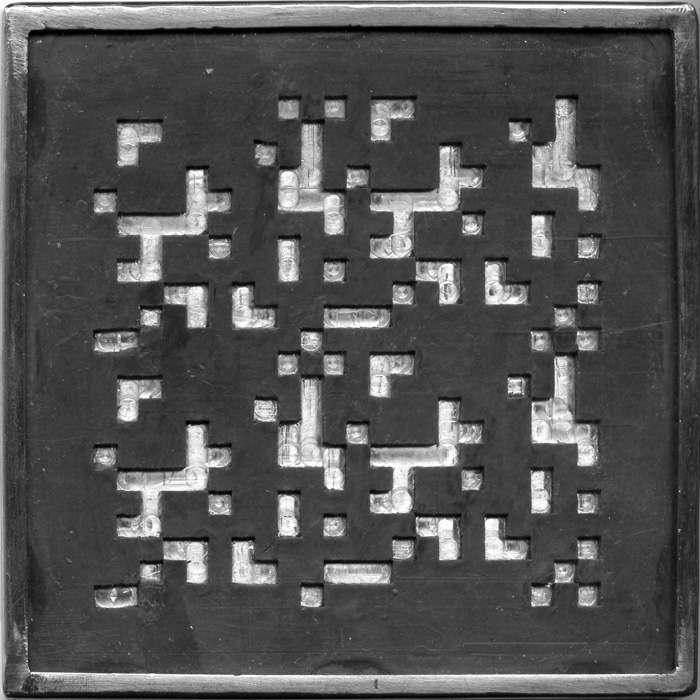
Coded aperture mask for gamma camera (for SPECT)

Coded apertures or coded-aperture masks are grids, gratings, or other patterns of materials opaque to various wavelengths of electromagnetic radiation. The wavelengths are usually high-energy radiation such as X-rays and gamma rays. A coded "shadow" is cast upon a plane by blocking radiation in a known pattern. The properties of the original radiation sources can then be mathematically reconstructed from this shadow. Coded apertures are used in X- and gamma ray imaging systems, because these high-energy rays cannot be focused with lenses or mirrors that work for visible light.

== Rationale ==
Simplified principle of operation of a HURA hexagonal coded aperture mask used in the SPI instrument of the INTEGRAL space telescope

Imaging is usually done at optical wavelengths using lenses and mirrors. However, the energy of hard X-rays and γ-rays is too high to be reflected or refracted, and simply passes through the lenses and mirrors of optical telescopes. Image modulation by apertures is, therefore, often used instead. The pinhole camera is the most basic form of such a modulation imager, but its disadvantage is low throughput, as its small aperture allows through little radiation. Only a tiny fraction of the light passes through the pinhole, which causes a low signal-to-noise ratio. To solve this problem, the mask can contain many holes, in one of several particular patterns, for example. Multiple masks, at varying distances from a detector, add flexibility to this tool. Specifically the modulation collimator, invented by Minoru Oda, was used to identify the first cosmic X-ray source and thereby to launch the new field of X-ray astronomy in 1965. Many other applications in other fields, such as tomography, have since appeared.

In a coded aperture more complicated than a pinhole camera, images from multiple apertures will overlap at the detector array. It is thus necessary to use a computational algorithm (which depends on the precise configuration of the aperture arrays) to reconstruct the original image. In this way a sharp image can be achieved without a lens. The image is formed from the whole array of sensors and is therefore tolerant to faults in individual sensors; on the other hand it accepts more background radiation than a focusing-optics imager (e.g., a refracting or reflecting telescope), and so is not favored at wavelengths where those techniques can be applied.

The coded aperture imaging technique is one of the earliest forms of computational photography and has a strong affinity to astronomical interferometry. Aperture-coding was first introduced by Ables and Dicke and later popularized by other publications.

== Well known types of masks ==
A rectangular MURA mask of size 101

Different mask patterns exhibit different image resolutions, sensitivities and background-noise rejection, and computational simplicities and ambiguities, aside from their relative ease of construction.

- FZP = Fresnel Zone Plate
- ORA = Optimized RAndom pattern
- URA = Uniformly Redundant Array
- HURA = Hexagonal Uniformly Redundant Array
- MURA = Modified Uniformly Redundant Array
- Levin

== Coded-aperture space telescopes ==
- Spacelab-2 X-ray Telescope XRT (1985)
- Rossi X-ray Timing Explorer (RXTE) – ASM (1995–2012)
- BeppoSAX – Wide Field Camera (1996–2002)
- INTEGRAL – IBIS and SPI (2002–2025)
- Swift – BAT (2004–2026)
- Ultra-Fast Flash Observatory Pathfinder mission (launched 2016) and UFFO-100 (its next generation)
- Astrosat – CZTI (Launched in 2015)
- SVOM – ECLAIRs (Launched in June 2024)
- In addition, the SAS-3 and RHESSI missions detect radiation based on a combination of masks and rotational modulation

== See also ==
- Computational imaging § Coded aperture imaging
- Computational photography
- Deconvolution
- Pinhole camera
- Range imaging § Coded aperture
- Rotational modulation collimator
- Tomographic reconstruction
- X-ray computed tomography
