= Space Sciences Laboratory =

Research facility in the United States

Coordinates: 37°52′49.08″N 122°14′38.68″W

SSL logo

The Space Sciences Laboratory (SSL) is an Organized Research Unit (ORU) of the University of California, Berkeley. Founded in 1959, the laboratory is located in the Berkeley Hills above the university campus. It has developed and continues to develop many projects in the space sciences, including the search for extraterrestrial life (SETI@home). The laboratory have built instruments to fly on more than 100 satellites and flown more than 150 balloons to "measure electric fields, auroral x-rays, hard x-rays and gamma rays, cosmic rays and the cosmic microwave background." The lab has also built and flown two dozen rockets to measure "auroral particles, UV emissions, and solar flare nuclei." It currently has projects categorized into planetary projects, geospace projects, solar and heliophysics projects, astrophysics and exoplanets projects, which are accompanied by a missions operations system, an engineering division and an information lab.

== History ==
The Space Sciences Laboratory (SSL) at Berkeley, California, was initiated in 1958 by a committee of faculty members who recognized that emerging rocket and satellite technology opened up new investigative realms for the physical, biological, and engineering sciences. The committee, chaired first by Professor Otto Struve of the Department of Astronomy and subsequently by Professor Edward Teller of the Department of Physics and the Lawrence Radiation Laboratory, explored with faculty members the opportunities associated with space research as well as the impact of rapidly escalating national space exploration programs (i.e. NASA) on graduate study and research. The committee proposed the formation of a Space Sciences Laboratory which, as a campus-wide multidisciplinary organization, would serve to integrate the space sciences on campus and stimulate new faculty-student research programs. The Regents, acting on the recommendation of Chancellor Glenn T. Seaborg and President Clark Kerr, authorized the formation of the Laboratory in 1959.

The Laboratory began its operations in January 1960 with the appointment of its first director, Professor Samuel Silver. Starting life in a corner of the old Leuschner Observatory on the main campus, the active interest of faculty members in the space sciences led to a rapid deployment of the physical and biological research programs. The modest quarters were soon inadequate for the group of research associates and graduate students. An especially large project on space physiology initiated by Professors Hardin B. Jones and Cornelius A. Tobias required much more space than available on campus, forcing the Laboratory to move to the Ford Assembly Building in Richmond, California, a property acquired by the University several years earlier.

The space physics program directed by Professor Kinsey A. Anderson and involving experiments carried by balloons, rockets, and satellites quickly outgrew its quarters requiring a move off campus as well. The Laboratory rented a store at 2119 University Avenue, just west of the University, and converted it into a figurative beehive of research activities. At the peak of its use, the "Market" (or the "Shoe Store") as this facility was known, housed electronic shops, the machine shop, the data processing equipment, environmental test equipment, and research projects on the Moon and the planets, the interplanetary medium, and the upper atmosphere of the Earth. Also housed here were social scientists who were studying the physical scientists and the problems of organization and administration of research.

The NASA Facilities Grant precipitated the construction of SSL's original buildings. The growth of multiple programs represented the fulfillment of one of the laboratory's goals, namely to stimulate faculty and student participation in space research. But the second major objective, that of developing the multidisciplinary substance and unique character of space research, could not be realized in a physically fragmented laboratory. With the construction of the new buildings, that goal was finally achieved. The building grant was awarded by the NASA (National Aeronautics and Space Administration) in 1962 and the building dedicated on 27 October 1966.

== Governance ==
The Space Sciences Laboratory is an Organized Research Unit (ORU) of the University of California, Berkeley. It is led by Berkeley faculty and Senior Fellows at the laboratory, and reports its activities to the Vice Chancellor for Research of UC Berkeley.

=== Funding ===
In its early years, the NASA followed the policy of funding university research on an individual project basis. It was not until 1961, when James E. Webb became the administrator of NASA, that the agency formulated a broad and far-reaching program of space research and exploration. The Office of Grants and Research Contracts instituted two programs: the Sustaining Grant Program and the Facilities Program. The Berkeley campus was one of the first universities to receive grants under these two programs.

The Sustaining Grant, which provided the Space Sciences Laboratory with a core of funds for interdisciplinary research in the physical, biological, engineering, and social sciences, gave the Laboratory a foundation on which to build faculty programs and to generate new areas of graduate training through research. The grant was invaluable in developing the space sciences program on the Berkeley campus.

== Building and location ==
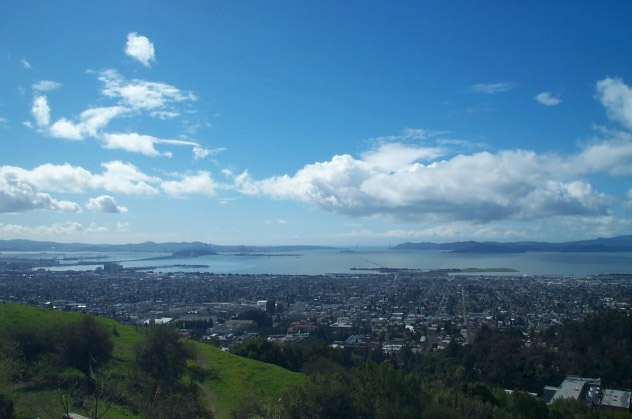
The view of the San Francisco Bay as seen from the nearby Lawrence Hall of Science in Berkeley, California.

The Laboratory is located in a wooded site in the Berkeley Hills. The building is directly adjacent to the Mathematical Sciences Research Institute and slightly above the Lawrence Hall of Science. The architects designed the building to fit the setting with a view of the natural surroundings.

== Research projects ==
SSL developed and maintains the SETI@home project which pioneered the application of distributed computing to the space sciences. It created the related projects Stardust@home and Berkeley Open Infrastructure for Network Computing (BOINC). It is home to the Space Physics Research Group, which does plasma physics research.

It has developed many satellite missions and serves as a ground station for those missions. Some of the satellites it has developed are:

- Reuven Ramaty High Energy Solar Spectroscopic Imager (RHESSI) satellite
- Time History of Events and Macroscale Interactions during Substorms (THEMIS) satellite constellation
- Fast Auroral Snapshot Explorer (FAST) satellite
- Cosmic Hot Interstellar Plasma Spectrometer (CHIPS) satellite
- Extreme Ultraviolet Explorer (EUVE) satellite
- Infrared Spatial Interferometer (ISI)
- Ionospheric Connection Explorer (ICON) satellite
- Escape and Plasma Acceleration and Dynamics Explorers (ESCAPADE) twin satellites

It does science education outreach via the Center for Science Education (CSE).
