= Reuven Ramaty High Energy Solar Spectroscopic Imager =

NASA satellite of the Explorer program (2002-2018)

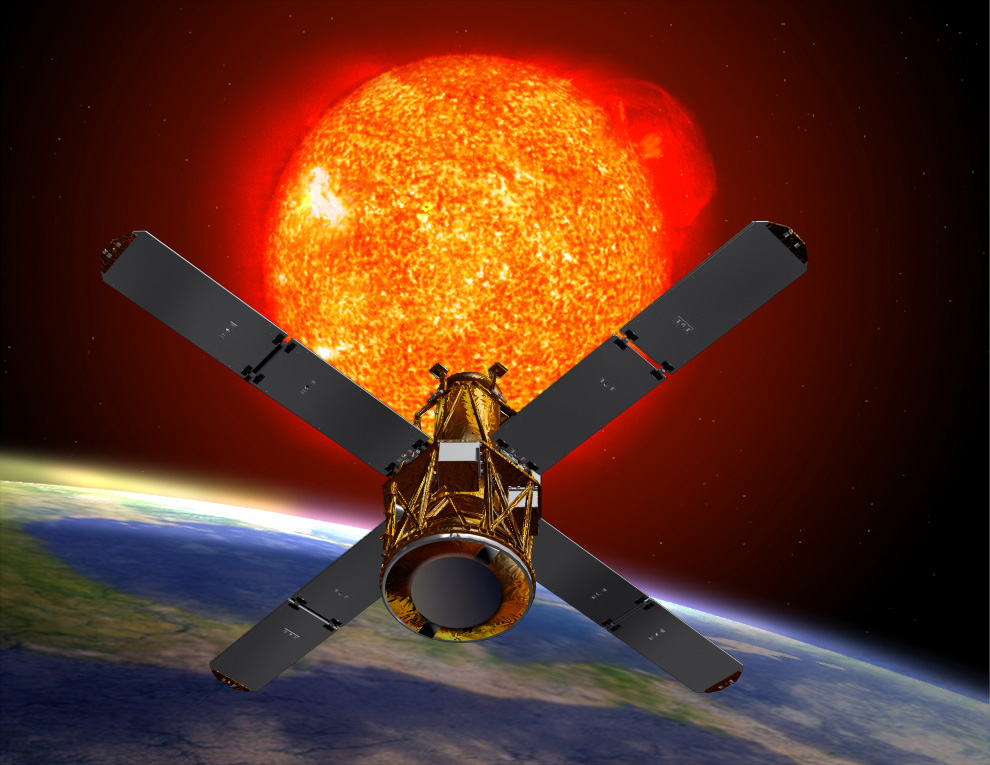
- RHESSI spacecraft observing the Sun
- Names: Explorer 81; HESSI; High Energy Solar Spectroscopic Imager; RHESSI; SMEX-6
- Mission type: Solar observatory
- Operator: NASA / Space Sciences Laboratory
- COSPAR ID: 2002-004A
- SATCAT no.: 27370
- Website: RHESSI
- Mission duration: 2 years (planned); 16 years, 6 months, 10 days (achieved)

Spacecraft properties
- Spacecraft: Explorer LXXXI
- Spacecraft type: Reuven Ramaty High Energy Solar Spectroscopic Imager
- Bus: RHESSI
- Manufacturer: Spectrum Astro Inc.
- Launch mass: 293 kg (646 lb)
- Dimensions: 2.16 × 5.76 m (7 ft 1 in × 18 ft 11 in)
- Power: 414 watts

Start of mission
- Launch date: 5 February 2002, 20:58:12 UTC
- Rocket: Pegasus XL (F31)
- Launch site: Cape Canaveral, Stargazer
- Contractor: Orbital Sciences Corporation
- Entered service: 2002

End of mission
- Deactivated: 16 August 2018
- Last contact: 11 April 2018
- Decay date: 20 April 2023 (UTC)

Orbital parameters
- Reference system: Geocentric orbit
- Regime: Low Earth orbit
- Perigee altitude: 579 km (360 mi)
- Apogee altitude: 607 km (377 mi)
- Inclination: 38.04°
- Period: 96.50 minutes

Main telescope
- Type: Coded aperture mask
- Focal length: 1.55 m (5 ft 1 in)
- Collecting area: 150 cm^{2} (23 sq in)
- Wavelengths: X-ray / gamma ray (γ-ray)
- Resolution: 2 arcseconds up to 100 keV; 7 arcseconds up to 400 keV; 36 arcseconds above 1 MeV

Instruments
- Reuven Ramaty High-Energy Solar Spectroscopic Imager (RHESSI)
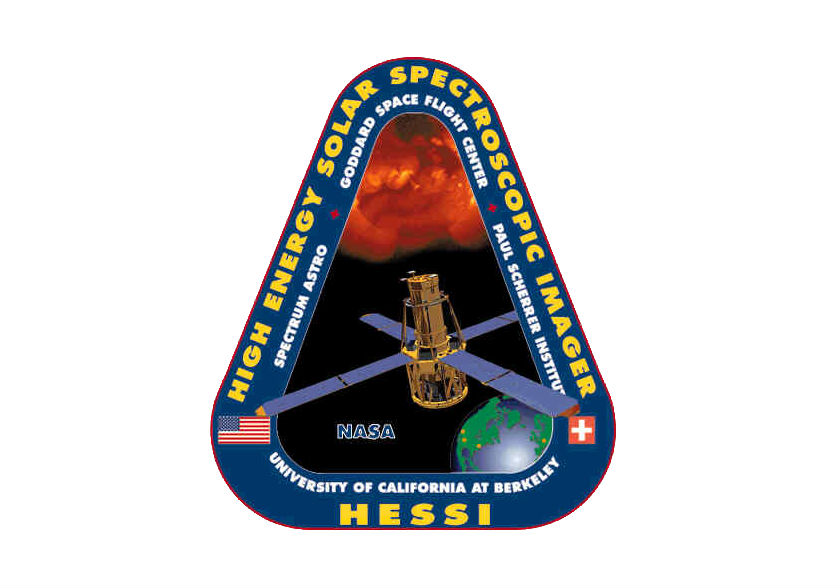
- HESSI mission patch Explorer program

Reuven Ramaty High Energy Solar Spectroscopic Imager (RHESSI, originally High Energy Solar Spectroscopic Imager or HESSI or Explorer 81) was a NASA solar flare observatory. It was the sixth mission in the Small Explorer program (SMEX), selected in October 1997 and launched on 5 February 2002, at 20:58:12 UTC. Its primary mission was to explore the physics of particle acceleration and energy release in solar flares.

The spacecraft re-entered Earth's atmosphere at 00:21 UTC on 20 April 2023, 21 years after its launch.

== Spacecraft ==
HESSI was renamed to RHESSI on 29 March 2002 in honor of Dr. Reuven Ramaty, a pioneer in the area of high energy solar physics. RHESSI was the first space mission named after a NASA scientist. RHESSI was built by Spectrum Astro for Goddard Space Flight Center and was operated by the Space Sciences Laboratory in Berkeley, California. The principal investigator from 2002 to 2012 was Robert Lin, who was succeeded by Säm Krucker.

The entire spacecraft rotated to provide the necessary signal modulation. The four, fixed solar panels were designed to provide enough gyroscopic moment to stabilize rotation about the solar vector. This largely eliminated the need for attitude control. The instrument detectors were nine high-purity germanium crystals. Each was cooled to cryogenic temperatures by a mechanical cryocooler. Germanium provided not only detections by the photoelectric effect, but inherent spectroscopy through the charge deposition of the incoming ray. The crystals were housed in a cryostat, and mounted with low-conductivity straps. A tubular telescope structure formed the bulk of the spacecraft. Its purpose was to hold the collimators above the Ge crystals at known, fixed positions.

The satellite bus consisted of the structure and mechanisms, the power system (including the battery, solar panels, and control electronics), the attitude control system, thermal control system, command and data handling system (C&DH), and telecommunications system. The spacecraft structure provided support for the telescope and other components. It was manufactured out of aluminum parts to be light weight but strong. The equipment platform had a honeycomb structure to further reduce the weight. The spacecraft was manufactured in Gilbert, Arizona by Spectrum Astro, Inc.

The Imaging Telescope Assembly consisted of the telescope tube, grid trays, Solar aspect system (SAS), and Roll angle system (RAS). It was constructed, assembled, aligned, and tested at the Paul Scherrer Institute in Switzerland. The front and rear grid trays were attached to the telescope tube. It maintained the separation and alignment of the trays. Nine grids were mounted on a grid tray at each end of the telescope tube. The grid pairs modulated the transmission of solar flare X-ray and gamma ray emissions through to the detectors as the spacecraft spins around the axis of the telescope tube. The modulated count rates in the nine detectors were used in computers on the ground to construct images of solar flares in different energy bands. The five coarse grids (square) were constructed by Van Beek Consultancy in Netherlands. The four fine grids (round) were constructed by Thermo Electron Tecomet in Massachusetts. All grids were characterized both optically and with X-rays at Goddard Space Flight Center before being shipped to the Paul Scherrer Institute for integration into the imaging telescope assembly.

The spectrometer contained nine germanium detectors that were positioned behind the nine grid pairs on the telescope. These artificially grown crystals, pure to over one part in a trillion, were manufactured by the ORTEC division of Perkin Elmer Instruments. When they were cooled to cryogenic temperatures and a high voltage was put across them (up to 4000 volts), they converted incoming X-rays and gamma-rays to pulses of electric current. The amount of current was proportional to the energy of the photon, and was measured by sensitive electronics designed at the Lawrence Berkeley National Laboratory and the Space Sciences Laboratory, at Berkeley, California. The detectors were cooled with an electromechanical Stirling-cycle cryocooler built by SunPower Inc., and flight qualified at Goddard Space Flight Center. It maintained them at the required operating temperature of −198 °C (−324.4 °F), or 75° above absolute zero).

== Mission concept ==
RHESSI was designed to image solar flares in energetic photons from soft X-rays (~3 keV) to gamma rays (up to ~20 MeV) and to provide high resolution spectroscopy up to gamma-ray energies of ~20 MeV. Furthermore, it had the capability to perform spatially resolved spectroscopy with high spectral resolution.

== Scientific objectives ==
Researchers believe that much of the energy released during a flare is used to accelerate, to very high energies, electrons (emitting primarily X-rays) and protons and other ions (emitting primarily gamma rays). The new approach of the RHESSI mission was to combine, for the first time, high-resolution imaging in hard X-rays and gamma rays with high-resolution spectroscopy, so that a detailed energy spectrum could be obtained at each point of the image. This new approach enabled researchers to find out where these particles are accelerated and to what energies. Such information will advance understanding of the fundamental high-energy processes at the core of the solar flare phenomena.

The primary scientific objective of RHESSI was to understand the following processes that take place in the magnetized plasmas of the solar atmosphere during a flare:

- Impulsive energy release
- Particle acceleration
- Particle and energy transport

These high-energy processes play a major role at sites throughout the Universe ranging from magnetospheres to active galaxies. Consequently, the importance of understanding these processes transcends the field of solar physics; it is one of the major goals of space physics and astrophysics.

The high energy processes of interest include the following:

- The rapid release of energy stored in unstable magnetic configurations
- The equally rapid conversion of this energy into the kinetic energy of hot plasma and accelerated particles (primarily electrons, protons and ions)
- The transport of these particles through the solar atmosphere and into interplanetary space
- The subsequent heating of the ambient solar atmosphere

These processes involve:

- Particle energies to many GeV
- Temperatures of tens or even hundreds of millions of degrees
- Densities as low as 100 million particles per square cm
- Spatial scales of tens of thousands of kilometers, and
- Magnetic containment times of seconds to hours

It is impossible to duplicate these conditions in laboratories on the Earth.

The acceleration of electrons is revealed by hard X-ray and gamma-ray bremsstrahlung while the acceleration of protons and ions is revealed by gamma-ray lines and continuum. The proximity of the Sun means not only that these high-energy emissions are orders of magnitude more intense than from any other cosmic source but also that they can be better resolved, both spatially and temporally.

== Imaging ==
Since X-rays are not easily reflected or refracted, imaging in X-rays is difficult. One solution to this problem is to selectively block the X-rays. If the X-rays are blocked in a way that depends on the direction of the incoming photons, then it may be possible to reconstruct an image. The imaging capability of RHESSI was based on a Fourier transform technique using a set of 9 Rotational Modulation Collimators (RMCs) as opposed to mirrors and lenses. Each RMC consisted of two sets of widely spaced, fine-scale linear grids. As the spacecraft rotated, these grids blocked and unblocked any X-rays which may have come from the Sun modulating the photon signal in time. The modulation could be measured with a detector having no spatial resolution placed behind the RMC since the spatial information was now stored in the time domain. The modulation pattern over half a rotation for a single RMC provided the amplitude and phase of many spatial Fourier components over a full range of angular orientations but for a small range of spatial source dimensions. Multiple RMCs, each with different slit widths, provided coverage over a full range of flare source sizes. Images were then reconstructed from the set of measured Fourier components in exact mathematical analogy to multi-baseline radio interferometry. RHESSI provided spatial resolution of 2 arcseconds at X-ray energies from ~4 keV to ~100 keV, 7 arcseconds to ~400 keV, and 36 arcseconds for gamma-ray lines and continuum emission above 1 MeV.

RHESSI could also see gamma rays coming from off-solar directions. The more energetic gamma rays passed through the spacecraft structure, and impacted the detectors from any angle. This mode was used to observe gamma-ray bursts (GRBs). The incoming gamma rays were not modulated by the grids, so positional and imaging information was not recorded. However, a crude position could still be derived by the fact that the detectors had front and rear pickups. Also, the detectors near the burst shielded the ones away from the burst. Comparing signal strengths around the nine crystals, and front-to-back, then gave a coarse, two-dimensional position in space.

When combined with high-resolution time stamps of the detector hits, the RHESSI solution could be cross-referenced on the ground with other spacecraft in the IPN (Interplanetary Network) to provide a fine solution. The large area and high sensitivities of the germanium crystal assembly made RHESSI a formidable IPN component. Even when other spacecraft could provide burst locations, few could provide as high-quality spectra of the burst (in both time and energy) as RHESSI. Rarely, however, a GRB occurred near the Sun, in the collimated field of view. The grids then provided full information, and RHESSI was able to provide a fine GRB location even without IPN correlation.

== Experiment ==
=== Reuven Ramaty High-Energy Solar Spectroscopic Imager (RHESSI) ===
RHESSI was intended to image at high resolution solar flares in X-rays and gamma rays. The X-rays and gamma rays covered an energy range of 3 keV-20 MeV with an energy resolution of about 1 keV and a spatial resolution of just a few seconds of arc. The imaging was accomplished by a 45 × 170 cm (18 × 67 in) tube containing nine pairs (one behind the other, spaced 1.5 m (4 ft 11 in) apart) of tungsten or molybdenum wire grids of width 9 cm (3.5 in) mounted parallel to the rotation axis of the tube pointing at the Sun. The tube rotated about its axis as the spacecraft spun at a rate of 15 rpm. During a rotation, a photon from any point on the Sun could either pass through a grid-pair or be blocked by one or other of the grids. This caused a modulation of the intensity of photons emanating from that point. The depth of modulation was zero for the photons arriving exactly along the spin axis and gradually increases to the off-axis photons. Behind each grid-pair was a cryogenic (75 K) germanium detector of 7.1 cm diameter and 8.5 cm (3.3 in) thickness. The output from each of the nine detectors, at any given energy, could be Fourier-analyzed to provide a full two-dimensional spatial spectrum of an extended source region on the Sun. The full spatial spectrum was possible because each wire grid pair had a different slit width, spacing and wire thickness. Data accumulation was about 16 Gb during a 10-minutes rotation. The telemetry data was collected at Berkeley (California), Wallops Flight Facility (WFF), Virginia, Santiago, Chile and Weilheim, Germany. Science analysis of the data involved close collaboration with many dedictated ground based and satellite based solar observatories. A secondary goal of RHESSI was to observe astronomical sources such as Crab Nebula.

== Results ==
RHESSI observations changed our perspective on solar flares, particularly on high-energy processes in flares. Its observations led to numerous publications in scientific journals and presentations at conferences. Through 2017, the satellite was referenced in 2,474 publications, books, and presentations. The collection "High-Energy Aspects of Solar Flares: A RHESSI Inspired Monograph" contains reviews of RHESSI solar flare research up to 2011.

- RHESSI was the first satellite to image gamma rays from a solar flare.
- It was the first satellite to accurately measure terrestrial gamma-ray flashes that come from thunderstorms, and it found that such flashes occur more often than thought and the gamma rays have a higher frequency on average than the average for cosmic sources.

Following communication difficulties, RHESSI ceased science operations on 11 April 2018 at 01:50 UTC. It was decommissioned on 16 August 2018 and remained in a stable low Earth orbit which gradually decayed due to atmospheric drag.

== See also ==
- Explorers program
