= Rotational modulation collimator =

High-energy X-ray image creation devices

Rotational modulation collimators (or RMCs) are a specialization of the modulation collimator, an imaging device invented by Minoru Oda. Devices of this type create images of high energy X-rays (or other radiations that cast shadows). Since high energy X-rays are not easily focused, such optics have found applications in various instruments. RMCs selectively block and unblock X-rays in a way which depends on their incoming direction, converting image information into time variations. Various mathematical transformations can then reconstitute the image of the source.

The Small Astronomy Satellite 3, launched in 1975, was one orbiting experiment that used RMCs. A more recent satellite that used RMCs was RHESSI.

== See also ==
- Coded aperture
- Collimator
- Modulation
