= Wolter telescope =

X-ray source magnifier

Wolter telescopes of types I, II and III (top to bottom).

A Wolter telescope is a telescope for X-rays that only uses grazing incidence optics – mirrors that reflect X-rays at very shallow angles in the regime of total external reflection.

== Problems with conventional telescope designs ==
Conventional telescope designs require reflection or refraction in a manner that does not work well for X-rays. Visible light optical systems use either lenses or mirrors aligned for nearly normal incidence – that is, the light waves travel nearly perpendicular to the reflecting or refracting surface. Conventional mirror telescopes work poorly with X-rays, since X-rays that strike mirror surfaces nearly perpendicularly are either transmitted or absorbed – not reflected.

Lenses for visible light are made of transparent materials with an index of refraction substantially different from 1, but all known X-ray-transparent materials have index of refraction essentially the same as 1, so a long series of X-ray lenses, known as compound refractive lenses, are required in order to achieve focusing without significant attenuation.

== X-ray mirror telescope design ==
X-ray mirrors can be built, but only if the angle from the plane of reflection is very low (typically 10 arc-minutes to 2 degrees). These are called "glancing" (or "grazing") incidence mirrors. In 1952, Hans Wolter outlined three ways a telescope could be built using only this kind of mirror. These are called Wolter telescopes of type I, II, and III. Each has different advantages and disadvantages.

Wolter's key innovation was that by using two mirrors it is possible to create a telescope with a usably wide field of view. In contrast, a grazing incidence telescope with just one parabolic mirror could focus X-rays, but only very close to the centre of the field of view. The rest of the image would suffer from extreme coma.

== See also ==
- List of telescope types
- Nuclear Spectroscopic Telescope Array (NuSTAR) (2012+)
- Swift Gamma-Ray Burst Mission Contains a Wolter Type-I X-ray telescope (2004+)
- Chandra X-ray Observatory Orbiting observatory using a Wolter X-ray telescope. (1999+)
- XMM-Newton Orbiting X-ray observatory using a Wolter Type-I X-ray telescope. (1999+)
- ROSAT Orbiting X-ray observatory (1990-1999)
- eROSITA Orbiting X-ray observatory using Wolter Type-I X-ray telescope on board Spektr-RG (SRG) (2019+)
- ART-XC Orbiting X-ray observatory using Wolter Type-I X-ray telescope on board Spektr-RG (SRG)(2019+)
- ATHENA (2031+)
- Neutron microscope
- Hans Wolter
