= Max Planck Institute for Extraterrestrial Physics =

German research institute

Coordinates: 48°15′42″N 11°40′18″E

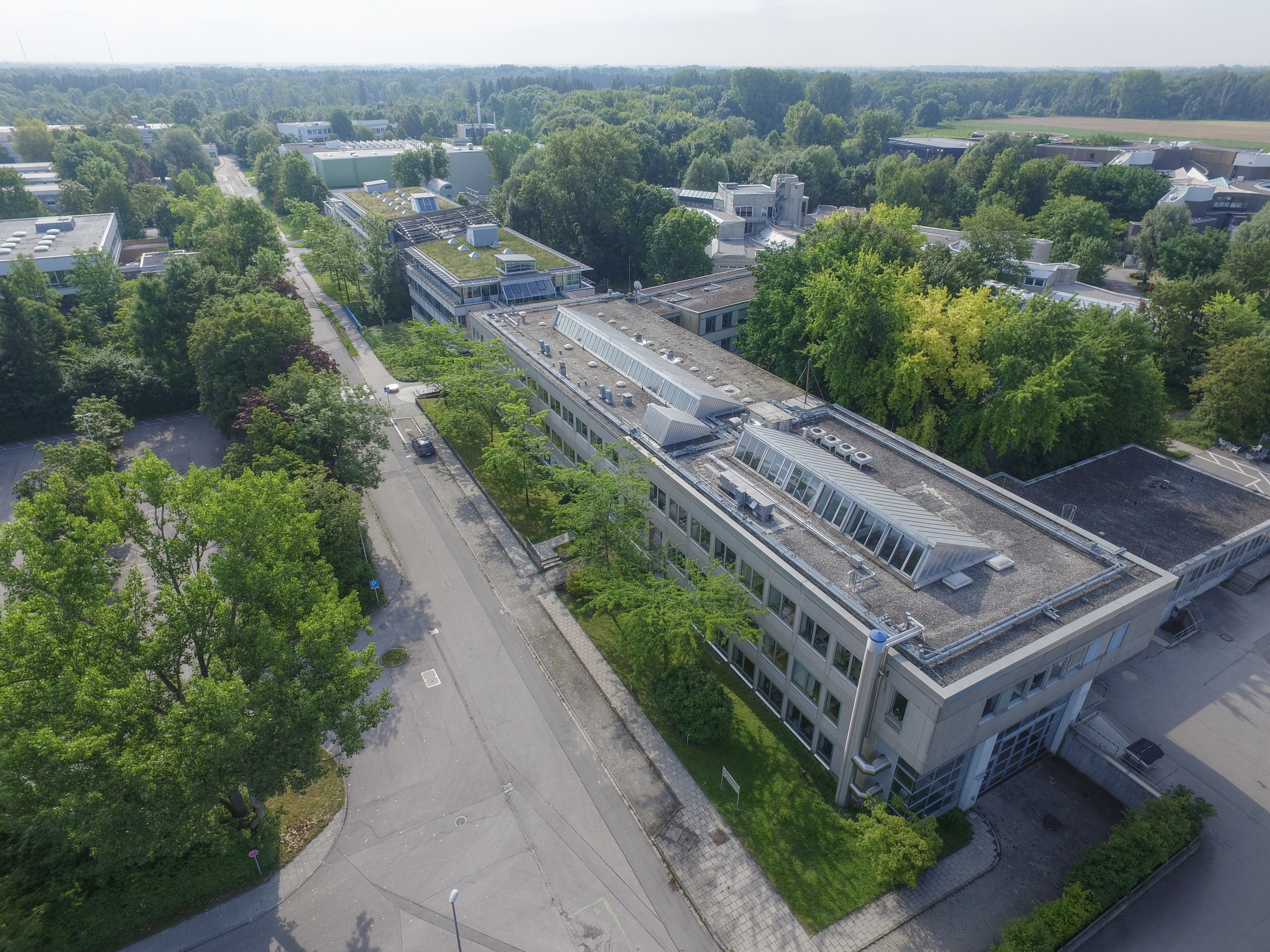
Max Planck Institute for Extraterrestrial Physics

The Max Planck Institute for Extraterrestrial Physics (German: MPI fur extraterrestrische Physik) is part of the Max Planck Society, located in Garching, near Munich, Germany. In 1991 the Max Planck Institute for Physics and Astrophysics split up into the Max Planck Institute for Extraterrestrial Physics, the Max Planck Institute for Physics and the Max Planck Institute for Astrophysics. The Max Planck Institute for Extraterrestrial Physics was founded as sub-institute in 1963. The scientific activities of the institute are mostly devoted to astrophysics with telescopes orbiting in space. A large amount of the resources are spent for studying black holes in the Milky Way Galaxy and in the remote universe.

Over a 50+ year period since its founding, the Max Planck Institute for Extraterrestrial Physics was focused on gamma-ray astronomy as one of its core fields. However, research in gamma-ray astrophysics began to decline as institutional support started to dwindle in 2010.
