= Russian Space Research Institute =

Division of the Russian Academy of Sciences

Space Research Institute of the Russian Academy of Sciences (IKI RAN)

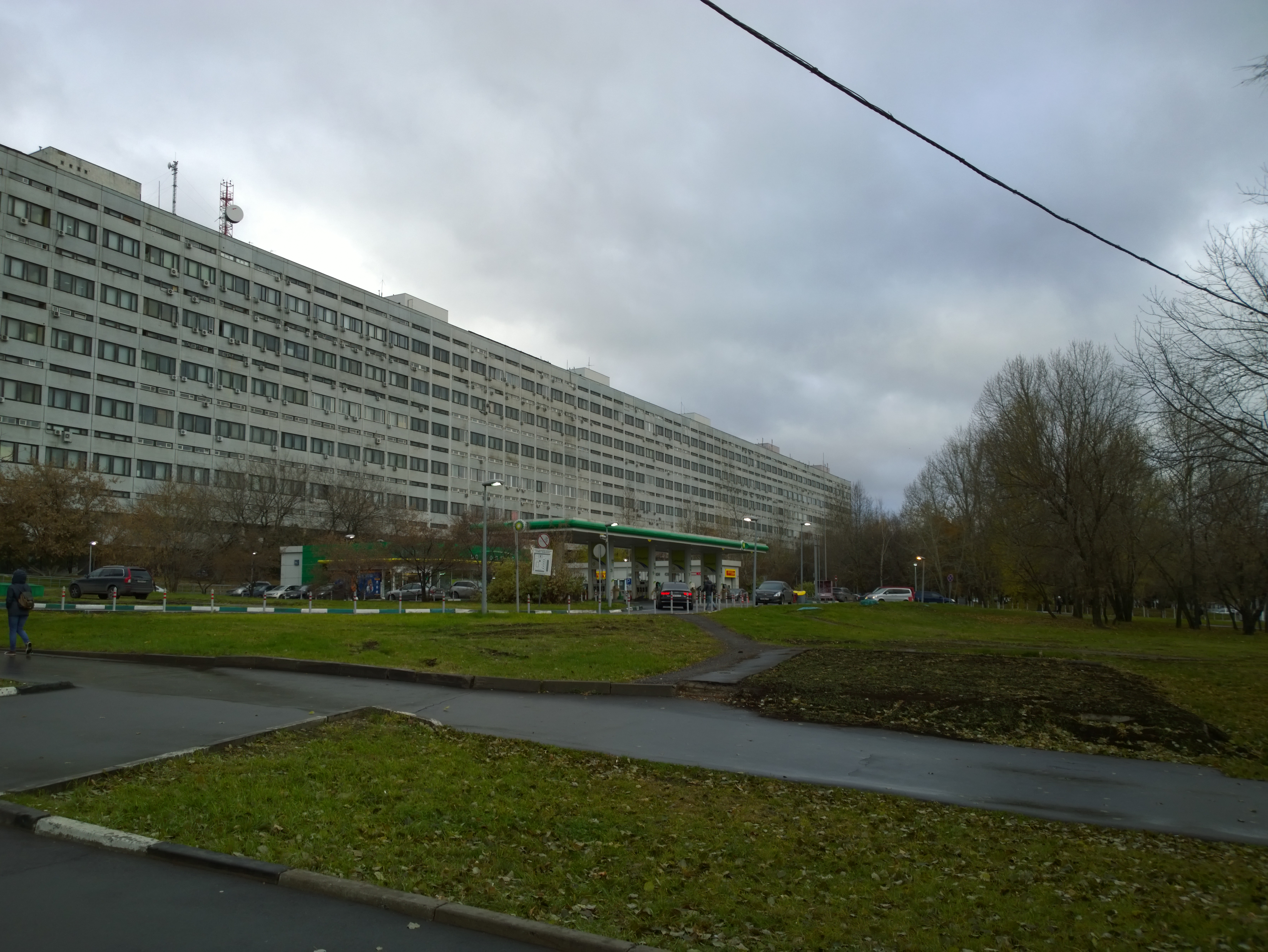
- Formation: May 15, 1965; 61 years ago
- Location: Moscow, Russia
- Coordinates: 55°39′20″N 37°31′58″E
- Official language: Russian; English
- Parent organization: Russian Academy of Sciences
- Staff: 289
- Website: iki.cosmos.ru www.iki.rssi.ru/eng/index.htm
- Formerly called: Space Research Institute of the USSR Academy of Sciences (ИКИ АН СССР, IKI AN SSSR)

The Russian Space Research Institute (Russian: Институт космических исследований Российской академии наук, romanized: Institut kosmicheskikh issledovaniy Rossiyskoy akademii nauk, lit. 'Space Research Institute of the Russian Academy of Sciences'; SRI RAS, Russian abbreviation: ИКИ РАН, IKI RAN) is the leading organization of the Russian Academy of Sciences on space exploration to benefit fundamental science. It was formerly known as the Space Research Institute of the USSR Academy of Sciences (Russian abbr.: ИКИ АН СССР, IKI AN SSSR). It is usually known by the shorter name Space Research Institute and especially by the initialism IKI.

The institute is located in Moscow with a staff of 289 scientists. It conducts scientific research in the fields of astrophysics, planetary science, solar physics, Sun-Earth relations, cosmic plasma, and geophysics. IKI also develops and tests space technologies in collaboration with the Russian Academy of Sciences and Roscosmos, the Russian Federal Space Agency.

== History ==
It was founded on May 15, 1965, by the Soviet Union's Council of Ministers decree #392-147. Initially, the institute formed its staff by drawing scientists from other research organizations. With time, it grew to two thousand employees, including those in a few branches located elsewhere in the country. In 1992, a year after the dissolution of the Soviet Union it was rechristened with its present name.

== Directors of the institute ==
1. Georgy Petrov (1965–1973)
2. Roald Z. Sagdeev (1973–1988)
3. Albert Galeev (1988–2002)
4. Lev Zeleny (2002–2018)
5. Anatoly Petrukovich (2018–present)

== Research ==
The institute engages in research in the following areas:

- High-energy astrophysics
- Planetary science
- Space plasma physics
- Interplanetary medium and solar wind
- Earth science
- Optical physics research
- Satellite Situation Center
- Russian Space Science Internet
- Data Archive

== Current missions and experiments ==
- Plasma-F (in Russian) suit (three scientific instruments and data processing unit) onboard Spektr-R spacecraft (end of mission 2019),
- HEND (short for High Energy Neutron Detector) instrument onboard Mars Odyssey mission (NASA),
- Mars Express (ESA) mission for Mars remote sensing. IKI contributed to three instruments on board the mission: OMEGA mapping spectrometer, PFS (Planetary Fourier Spectrometer), and SPICAM infrared and UV spectrometer. Russian scientists are also co-investigators in most scientific groups of the project. Launched in 2003.
- Venus Express (ESA) mission for Venus remote sensing. IKI contributed to two instruments on board the spacecraft: SPICAV/SOIR infrared and UV-spectrometer and PFS (Planetary Fourier Spectrometer). Russian scientists are also co-investigators in three other experiments VIRTIS, VMS, and ASPERA. Launched in 2005.
- LEND (short for Lunar Exploration Neutron Detector) instrument onboard Lunar Reconnaissance Orbiter (NASA),
- DAN (short for Dynamic Albedo of Neutrons) instrument onboard Curiosity rover (Mars Science Laboratory project, NASA),
- Chibis-M microsatellite (end of mission October 15, 2014),
- INTEGRAL (INTErnational Gamma-Ray Astrophysics Laboratory, ESA) X-ray and gamma-ray orbital observatory. It was delivered to space by Proton launcher from Baikonur cosmodrome, under condition that Russian scientists get 25% of the observational time. IKI hosts INTEGRAK Russian Scientific Data Center,
- RTT150 Russian-Turkish 1.5-m Telescope. International observatory in Turkey (previously called AZT-22), mountain Bakyrlytepe is an international project carried out under supervision of the Ministry of Education and Science of Russian Federation and the Scientific and Technological Research Council of Turkey (TUBITAK). From the Russian side the main executing participants are Kazan State University (KGU) and IKI, from the Turkish side it is managed by TUBITAK National Observatory (TUG). In accordance to the agreement between the participants of the project, the telescope observing time is shared as follows: 45% – KGU, 15% – IKI, and 40% – are shared between Turkish universities through TUG,
- MKS-Obstanovka (ISS-Environment) experiment onboard International Space Station (Russian segment),
- RELEC (microsatellite experiment to study energetic particles in the near-Earth space, principal organisation — Skobeltsyn Institute for Nuclear Physics of Lomonosov Moscow State University).

Additionally, IKI's scientists belong to various international collaborations on a number of science projects, such as IBEX and Planck, and are engaged in studies with Earth-based facilities.
