= List of astronomy acronyms =

This is a compilation of initialisms and acronyms commonly used in astronomy. Most are drawn from professional astronomy, and are used quite frequently in scientific publications. A few are frequently used by the general public or by amateur astronomers.

The acronyms listed below were placed into one or more of these categories:

- Astrophysics terminology – physics-related acronyms
- Catalog – collections of tabulated scientific data
- Communications network – any network that functions primarily to communicate with spacecraft rather than performing astronomy
- Data – astrophysical data not associated with any single catalog or observing program
- Celestial object – acronyms for natural objects in space and for adjectives applied to objects in space
- Instrumentation – telescope and other spacecraft equipment, particularly detectors such as imagers and spectrometers
- Meeting – meetings that are not named after organizations
- Observing program – astronomical programs, often surveys, performed by one or more individuals; may include the groups that perform surveys
- Organization – any large private organization, government organization, or company
- Person – individual people
- Publication – magazines, scientific journals, and similar astronomy-related publications
- Software – software excluding catalogued data (which is categorized as "catalog") and scientific images
- Spacecraft – any spacecraft except space telescopes
- Telescope – ground-based and space telescopes; organizations that operate telescopes (for example, the National Optical Astronomy Observatory (NOAO)) are listed under "organization"

== 0–9 ==
- 1RXH – (catalog) 1st ROSAT X-ray HRI, a catalog of sources detected by ROSAT in pointed observations with its High Resolution Imager
- 1RXS – (catalog) 1ROSAT X-ray Survey, a catalog of sources detected by ROSAT in an all-sky survey
- 2dF – (instrumentation) Two-degree field, spectrograph on the Anglo-Australian Telescope
- 2dFGRS – (observing program) Two-degree-Field Galaxy Redshift Survey
- 2D-FRUTTI – (instrumentation) Two dimensional photon counting system
- 2SLAQ – (observing program) 2dF-SDSS LRG and QSO survey
- 2MASP – (catalog) Two-micron all sky survey prototype, an early version of the 2MASS catalog
- 2MASS – (observing program/catalog) Two-Micron All Sky Survey, an all-sky survey in the near-infrared; also, the catalog of sources from the survey
- 2MASSI – (catalog) Two-Micron All Sky Survey, Incremental release, one of the versions of the 2MASS catalog
- 2MASSW – (catalog) Two-Micron All Sky Survey, Working database, one of the versions of the 2MASS catalog
- 6dF – (instrumentation) six-degree field, spectrograph on the UKST

== A ==
- A&A – (publication) Astronomy & Astrophysics, a European scientific journal
- A4E – (organization) Astronomers for Planet Earth
- AAA – (organization) Amateur Astronomers Association of New York
- AAO – (organization) Australian Astronomical Observatory (prior to 1 July 2010: Anglo-Australian Observatory)
- AAS – (organization) American Astronomical Society
- AAT – (telescope) Anglo-Australian Telescope
- AAVSO – (organization) American Association of Variable Star Observers
- ABBA – ADC Backend For Bolometer Array
- ABRIXAS – (observing program) A BRoadband Imaging X-ray All-sky Survey
- AC – (catalog) Catalogue Astrographique
- ACE – (spacecraft) Advanced Composition Explorer
- ACIS – (instrumentation) Advanced CCD Imaging Spectrometer, an instrument on the Chandra X-Ray Observatory
- ACM – (meeting) Asteroids, Comets, and Meteors
- ACP – (instrumentation) – Aerosol Collector and Pyrolyser, an instrument on the Huygens probe
- ACS – (instrumentation) Advanced Camera for Surveys, an instrument on the Hubble Space Telescope
- ACT - Atacama Cosmology Telescope, a cosmological millimeter-wave telescope located on Cerro Toco in the Atacama Desert in the north of Chile.
- ACV – (celestial object) Alpha Canes Venatici, a class of rotating variable stars with strong magnetic fields named after Alpha Canum Venaticorum (Cor Caroli), the archetype for the class
- ACYG – (celestial object) Alpha CYGni, a class of rotating variable stars named after Alpha Cygni (Deneb), the archetype for the class
- ADAF – (astrophysics terminology) Advection Dominated Accretion Flow, a mechanism by which matter is slowly accreted onto a black hole
- ADC – (organization) Astronomical Data Center
- ADEC – (organization) Astrophysics Data Centers Executive Council, an organization that provides oversight for the Astrophysics Data and Information Services
- ADF – (organization) Astrophysics Data Facility
- ADS – (catalog) Aitken Double Stars
- ADS – (catalog) The Smithsonian Astrophysical Observatory/NASA astrophysics data system, an on-line database of almost all astronomical publications
- ADIS – (organization) Astrophysics Data and Information Services
- ADS – (organization) Astrophysics Data Service, an organization that maintains an online database of scientific articles
- AdS — (Astrophysics terminology) Anti-deSitter
- AEGIS – (observing program) the All-wavelength Extended Groth strip International Survey
- AFGL – (organization) Air Force Geophysics Laboratory, a research laboratory now part of the United States Air Force Research Laboratory
- AFOEV – (organization) Association française des observateurs d'étoiles variables
- AG – (organization) Astronomische Gesellschaft
- AGAPE – (observing program) Andromeda Galaxy and Amplified Pixels Experiment, a search for microlenses in front of the Andromeda Galaxy
- AGB – (celestial object) asymptotic giant branch, a type of red giant star
- AGC – (catalog) Arecibo general catalog
- AGK – (catalog) Astronomische Gesellschaft Katalog
- AGN – (celestial object) Active galactic nucleus
- AGU – (organization) American Geophysical Union
- AIM – (spacecraft) Aeronomy of Ice in the Mesosphere, a spacecraft that will study the Noctilucent clouds
- AIPS – (software) Astronomical Image Processing System
- AJ – (publication) Astronomical Journal
- ALaMO – (organization) Automated Lunar and Meteor Observatory
- ALEXIS – (instrumentation) Array of Low Energy X-ray Imaging Sensors
- ALMA – (telescope) Atacama Large Millimeter/Sub-millimeter Array
- ALPO – (organization) Association of Lunar and Planetary Observers
- AMANDA – (telescope) Antarctic Muon And Neutrino Detector Array, a neutrino telescope in Antarctica
- AMASE – (software) Astrophysics Multi-spectral Archive Search Engine
- AMBER – (telescope) a near-infrared interferometric instrument at VLTI
- AMS – (organization) American Meteor Society
- AN – (publication) Astronomische Nachrichten, a German scientific journal
- ANS – (telescope) Astronomical Netherlands Satellite
- ANS – (organization) Astro News Service
- ANSI – (organization) American National Standards Institute
- AO – (instrumentation) Adaptive optics
- AOR – (instrumentation) Astronomical observation request
- ApJ – (publication) Astrophysical Journal
  - ApJL – (publication) Astrophysical Journal Letters
  - ApJS – (publication) Astrophysical Journal Supplement Series
- APM – (instrumentation/catalog), Automatic plate measuring machine, a machine for making measurements from photographic plates; also, a catalog based on measurements by the machine
- APO – (organization) Apache Point Observatory
- APOD – (data) Astronomy Picture of the Day
- APT – (telescope) Automated Patrol Telescope
- ARC – (organization) Ames Research Center
- ARC – (organization) Astrophysical Research Consortium
- ARCADE – a balloon satellite experiment to measure the heating of the Universe by the first stars and galaxies after the Big Bang
- ASA – (organization) Astronomical Society of the Atlantic
- ASAS – All Sky Automated Survey
- ASCL – Astrophysics Source Code Library, a citable online registry of research source codes
- ASE – (organization) Astronomical Society of Edinburgh
- ASI – (organization) Agenzia Spaziale Italiana
- ASIAA – (organization) Academia Sinica Institute of Astronomy and Astrophysics
- ASKAP – (telescope) Australian Square Kilometre Array Pathfinder, a next-generation radio telescope under construction in Western Australia. It differs from previous radio-telescopes in having many pixels at the focus of each antenna.
- ASP – (organization) Astronomical Society of the Pacific
- ASTRO – (spacecraft) Autonomous Space Transport Robotic Operations
- ATA – (telescope) Allen Telescope Array, a radio interferometer array developed by the SETI Institute to search for possible signals from extraterrestrial life
- ATCA – (telescope) Australia Telescope Compact Array
- ATLAS – (observing program) Australia Telescope Large Area Survey, a deep radio astronomical sky survey of two SWIRE fields covering a total of about 7 square degrees of sky.
- ATM – (person) hobbyist engaged in Amateur telescope making (may also refer to the book of the same title, Amateur Telescope Making)
- AU – (measurement) Astronomical Unit, the distance between the Earth and the Sun
- AUASS – (organization) Arab Union for Astronomy and Space Sciences
- AURA – (organization) Association of Universities for Research in Astronomy
- AWCA – (meeting) American Workshop on Cometary Astronomy, an older name for the International Workshop on Cometary Astronomy
- AXP – (celestial object) Anomalous X-Ray Pulsar
- AXAF – (telescope) Advanced X-ray Astrophysics Facility, an older name for the Chandra X-ray Observatory

== B ==
- B – (catalog) Barnard catalog
- BAA – (organization) British Astronomical Association
- BAAS – (publication) Bulletin of the American Astronomical Society
- BAC – (catalog) Bordeaux Astrographic Catalog
- BAO – (astrophysics terminology) baryon acoustic oscillations
- BAO – (organization) Beijing Astronomical Observatory
- BASIS – (observing program) Burst and All Sky Imaging Survey
- BAT – (instrumentation) Burst Alert Telescope, an instrument on SWIFT
- BATC – (observing program) Beijing-Arizona-Taiwan-Connecticut, the name of a multi-wavelength sky survey
- BATSE – (instrument) Burst and Transient Source Experiment, an instrument on the Compton Gamma-Ray Observatory
- BATTeRS – (telescope) Bisei Asteroid Tracking Telescope for Rapid Survey
- BB – (astrophysics terminology) Black body
- BBXRT – (telescope) Broad Band X-Ray Telescope
- BCD – (celestial object) Blue compact dwarf
- BCD – (software) Basic calibrated data, data produced after basic processing
- BCEP – (celestial object) Beta CEPhei, a class of pulsating variable stars for which Beta Cephei is the archetypal object
  - also BCE
- BCG – (celestial object) Blue compact galaxy, another name for a blue compact dwarf, also bright central galaxy
- BCG – (celestial object) Brightest Cluster Galaxy, the brightest galaxy in a cluster of galaxies
- BCVS – (catalog) Bibliographic Catalogue of Variable Stars
- BD – (catalog) Bonner Durchmusterung
- BD – (celestial object) Brown dwarf
- BEN – (catalog) Jack Bennett catalog, a catalog of deep-sky objects for amateur astronomers
- BEL – (celestial object) broad emission line clouds in Active galactic nucleus
- BF – (astrophysics terminology) Broadening function
- BH – (celestial object) Black hole
- BHB – (celestial object) Blue horizontal branch, a type of luminous star
- BHC – (celestial object) Black hole candidate
- BHXRT – (celestial object) Black hole x-ray transient
  - also BHXT
- BICEP2 – (telescope) Background Imaging of Cosmic Extragalactic Polarization 2
- BIMA – (organization & telescope) Berkeley-Illinois-Maryland Association, and also B-M-I Array, microwave telescope it operated
- BIS – (organization) British Interplanetary Society
- BITP – (organization) – Bogolyubov Institute for Theoretical Physics, a Ukrainian research institute
- BKL - (Astrophysics terminology) Belinski–Khalatnikov–Lifshitz, a model of chaotic oscillations of spacetime near a singularity
- BLAGN – (celestial object) Broad-Line AGN, based on classification of spectral line widths
- BLLAC – (celestial object) BL LACertae, a class of active galaxies for which BL Lacertae is the archetypal object
  - also BLL
- BLAST – (telescope) – Balloon-borne Large Aperture Submillimeter Telescope
- BLR – (astrophysics term) the broad line region of the AGN
- BNSC – (organization) British National Space Centre, the older name for UKSA
- BOAO – (observatory) Bohyunsan Optical Astronomy Observatory, in Korea
- BOOMERanG – (telescope) Balloon Observations of Millimetric Extragalactic Radiation and Geophysics
- BPM – (catalog) Bruce proper motion
- BSG – (celestial object) Blue super giant
- BSS – (celestial object) Blue straggler star
  - also BS
- BSS – (observing program) Bigelow Sky Survey
- BY – (celestial object) BY Draconis, a class of rotating variable stars for which BY Draconis is the archetypal object

== C ==
- C – First Cambridge Catalogue of Radio Sources, 2C (Second Cambridge Catalog), 3C (Third Cambridge Catalog)...
- CADC – (organization) Canadian Astronomy Data Centre
- CAHA – (organization) Centro Astronómico Hispano Alemán, a German-Spanish Astronomical Centre
- CANDELS – (survey) Cosmic Assembly Near-Infrared Deep Extragalactic Legacy Survey or Cosmic Assembly and Dark Energy Legacy Survey
- CANTAR - (telescope) Colombian Antarctic Telescope for 21-cm Absorption during Reionization
- CAPS – (instrumentation) Cassini Plasma Spectrometer, an instrument on the Cassini spacecraft
- CARA – (organization) California Association for Research in Astronomy
- CANGAROO – Collaboration between Australian and Nippon for a Gamma Ray Observatory
- CARA – (organization) Center for Astrophysical Research in Antarctica
- CASCA – (organization) Canadian Astronomical Society / Société canadienne d'astronomie (the name is officially bilingual)
- CARMA – an array
- CASS – (organization) Center for Advanced Space Studies
- CASS – (organization) Center for Astrophysics and Space Sciences, an interdisciplinary research unit at UC San Diego
- CBAT – (organization) Central Bureau for Astronomical Telegrams
- CBE – Collisionless Boltzmann Equation
- CBR – (celestial object) cosmic background radiation
- CC – (celestial object) candidate companion, a newly detected observed object that initially appears to orbit another celestial object
- CCD – (instrumentation) Charge-coupled device
- CCD – (astrophysics terminology) – Color–color diagram, a plot that compares the differences between magnitudes in different wave bands
- CCDM – (catalog) Catalog of Components of Double and Multiple Stars
- CCO – (catalog) Catalogue of Cometary Orbits
- CCO – (celestial object) central compact object, a compact star in the center of a planetary nebula
- CCS – (celestial object) cool carbon star
- CCSNe - (celestial object) core collapse supernovae
- CCSFS – Cape Canaveral Space Force Station, a United States Space Force launch base
- CD – (catalog) Cordoba Durchmusterung
- CDFS – Chandra Deep Field South
- CDIMP – (catalog) Catalogue of Discoveries and Identifications of Minor Planets
- CDM – (astrophysics terminology) Cold Dark Matter, any model for structure formation in the universe that characterize "cold" particles such as WIMPs as dark matter
- CDS – (organization) Centre de Données astronomiques de Strasbourg
- CELT – (telescope) – California Extremely Large Telescope, an older name for the Thirty Meter Telescope
- CEMP – (celestial object) Carbon-enhanced metal-poor, a type of carbon star
  - CEMP-no – (celestial object) Carbon-enhanced metal-poor star with no enhancement of elements produced by the r-process or s-process nucleosynthesis
  - CEMP-r – (celestial object) Carbon-enhanced metal-poor star with an enhancement of elements produced by r-process nucleosynthesis
  - CEMP-s – (celestial object) Carbon-enhanced metal-poor star with an enhancement of elements produced by s-process nucleosynthesis
  - CEMP-r/s – (celestial object) Carbon-enhanced metal-poor star with an enhancement of elements produced by both r-process and s-process nucleosynthesis
- CEP – (celestial object) CEPheid, a type of pulsating variable star
- CEPS – (organization) Center for Earth and Planetary Studies
- CfA – (organization) Center for Astrophysics
- CFHT – (telescope) Canada–France–Hawaii Telescope
- CFRS – (observing program), Canada–France Redshift Survey
- CG – (astrophysics terminology) Center of gravity
- CG – (celestial object) Cometary Globule, a Bok globule that show signs of a tail-like extension
- CG – (celestial object) Compact galaxy
- CGM - (astrophysics terminology) Circumgalactic Medium
- CGCS – (celestial object) Cool galactic carbon star
- CGRO – (telescope) Compton Gamma Ray Observatory
- CGSS – (catalog) Catalogue of Galactic S Stars
- CH — (Astrophysics terminology) Cauchy horizon, an inner horizon in a spinning and/or charged black hole
- CHARA – (organization) Center for High Angular Resolution Astronomy
- CHeB – (celestial object) Core Helium Burning
- CHIPSat – Cosmic Hot Interstellar Plasma Spectrometer satellite
- CHIRON -
- CIAO – (software) Chandra Interactive Analysis of Observations, software for processing Chandra X-ray Observatory data
- CIAO – (instrumentation) Coronagraphic Imager with Adaptive Optics, an instrument for the Subaru Telescope
- CIBR – (celestial object) Cosmic infrared background radiation
  - also CIB
- CIDA – (instrumentation) Cometary Interplanetary Dust Analyzer, an instrument on the Stardust spacecraft
- CINDI – Coupled Ion-Neutral Dynamics Investigation
- CINEOS – (observing program) Campo Imperatore Near-Earth Object Survey
- CIO – (catalog) Catalog of Infrared Observations
- CISCO – (instrumentation) Cooled Infrared Spectrograph and Camera for OHS, an instrument for the Subaru Telescope
- CM – (astrophysics terminology) center of mass
- CMB – (celestial object) cosmic microwave background radiation
  - also CMBR, CBR, MBR
- CMC – (catalog) Carlsberg Meridian Catalogue
- CMD – (astrophysics terminology) color–magnitude diagram, the Hertzsprung–Russell diagram or similar diagrams
  - also CM
- CME – coronal mass ejection
- CNB – (celestial object) cosmic neutrino background
- CNES – (organization) Centre Nationale d'Etudes Spatiales, the French Space Agency
- CNO – (astrophysics terminology) Carbon-Nitrogen-Oxygen, a sequence of nuclear fusion processes
- CNR – (organization) Consiglio Nazionale delle Ricerche
- CNSR – (spacecraft) Comet nucleus sample return
- COBE – (telescope) Cosmic Background Explorer, a space telescope used to study the cosmic microwave background radiation
- COHSI – (instrumentation) Cambridge OH-Suppression Instrument
- Col – (catalog) Collinder catalog
- COMICS – (instrumentation) COoled Mid-Infrared Camera and Spectrometer, an instrument for the Subaru Telescope
- CGRO – (telescope) COMPton TELescope, another name for the Compton Gamma Ray Observatory
- COROT – (telescope) COnvection ROtation and planetary Transits, a space telescope for detecting extrasolar planets
- COSMOS – (observing program) Cosmic Evolution Survey
- COSPAR – (organization) COmmittee on SPAce Research
- COSTAR – (instrumentation) Corrective Optics Space Telescope Axial Replacement, corrective optics for the Hubble Space Telescope
- CP – (astrophysics terminology) Chemically peculiar, stars with peculiar chemical compositions
- CPD – (catalog) Cape Photographic Durchmusterung
- CRAF – (spacecraft) Comet Rendezvous Asteroid Flyby
- CRL – Cambridge Research Laboratories (infrared sky survey)
- CRRES – Combined Release and Radiation Effects Satellite
- CSA – (organization) Canadian Space Agency
- CSBN – (organization) Committee for Small-Body Nomenclature
- CSE – (celestial object) circumstellar envelope, a roughly spherical planetary nebula formed from dense stellar wind if not present before the formation of a star.
- CSI – (catalog) Catalog of Stellar Identification, a compilation of the catalogs, BD, CD, and CPD
- CSO – (telescope) Caltech Submillimeter Observatory
- CSP – (astrophysics terminology) composite stellar population
- CSPN – (celestial object) central star of planetary nebula
  - also CSPNe (plural form of CSPN)
- CSS – (observing program) Catalina Sky Survey
- CST – (astrophysics terminology) ConStanT, non-variable stars
- CSV – (catalog) Catalog of Suspected Variables
- CTIO – (telescope/organization) Cerro Tololo Interamerican Observatory
- CTTS – (celestial object) Classical T-Tauri Star
- CV – (celestial object) cataclysmic variable, a type of variable binary star system that contains a white dwarf and a companion star that changes
- CW – (celestial object) Cepheid W Virginis, a class of Cepheids named after W Virginis, the archetype for the class
  - CWA – (celestial object) Cepheid W Virginis A, a subclass of CW stars that vary in brightness on timescales of less than 8 days
  - CWB – (celestial object) Cepheid W Virginis B, a subclass of CW stars that vary in brightness on timescales greater than 8 days
- CXBR – (celestial object) Cosmic x-ray background radiation
- CXO – (catalog) Chandra X-ray Observation, a catalog based from the Chandra space telescope

== D ==
- DAO – (organization) Dominion Astrophysical Observatory
- DCEP – (celestial object) Delta CEPhei, a class of Cepheids named after Delta Cephei, the archetype for the class
- DDEB – (celestial object) double-lined eclipsing binary
- DENIS – (observing program/catalog) DEep Near Infrared Survey
- DENIS-P – (catalog) DEep Near Infrared Survey, Provisory designation [or also known as DNS].
- DES – (observing program) Dark Energy Survey
- DESI - (observing program) Dark Energy Spectroscopic Instrument
- DEC – Declination
- DES – (observing program) Deep Ecliptic Survey
- DIB – (celestial object) diffuse interstellar band, an absorption feature in stellar spectra with an interstellar origin
- DIRBE – (instrumentation) Diffuse InfraRed Background Experiment, a multiwavelength infrared detector used to map dust emission
- DISR – (instrumentation) – Descent Imager/Spectral Radiometer, an instrument on the Huygens probe
- DMR – (instrumentation) Differential Microwave Radiometer, a microwave instrument that would map variations (or anisotropies) in the CMB
- DM – dark matter, the unidentified non-baryonic matter
- DN – (celestial object) Dwarf nova
- DNS – (celestial object) double neutron star, another name for a binary neutron star system. [Caution: Do not confuse with DNS relating to DENIS – Deep Near Infrared Survey].
- DOG – (celestial object) dust-obscured galaxy, a galaxy with an unusually high ratio of infrared-to-optical emission, implying strong dust absorption and re-emission.
- DOM - (instrumentation) Digital optical module, an instrument in the IceCube Neutrino Observatory and Antarctic Muon And Neutrino Detector Array
- DPOSS – (data) Digitized Palomar Observatory Sky Survey
- DRAGN (celestial object) Double Radio Source Associated with a Galactic Nucleus
- DS – (celestial object) dwarf star
- DSCT – Delta SCuTi, a class of pulsating variable stars named after Delta Scuti, the archetype for the class
- DSN – (communications network) Deep Space Network, a network of radio antennas used for communicating to spacecraft
- DSS – (data) Digitized Sky Survey
- DSFG - (celestial object) Dusty Star Forming Galaxy
- DWE – (instrumentation) – Doppler Wind Experiment, an instrument on the Huygens probe

== E ==
- E – (celestial object) Eclipsing, a binary star system with variable brightness in which the stars eclipse each other
  - EA – (celestial object) Eclipsing Algol, a class of eclipsing binary stars named after Algol, the archetype for the class
  - EB – (celestial object) Eclipsing Beta Lyrae, a class of eclipsing binary stars named after Beta Lyrae, the archetype for the class
  - EW – (celestial object) Eclipsing W Ursa Majoris, a class of eclipsing binary stars named after W Ursa Majoris, the archetype for the class
- EAAE – (organization) European Association for Astronomy Education
- EACOA – (organization) – East Asian Core Observatories Association
- EAO – (organization) – East Asian Observatory, operates the JCMT
- E-ELT – (telescope) – European Extremely Large Telescope
- EAPSNET – (organization) – East-Asian Planet Search Network
- EC – (celestial object) Embedded Cluster, a star cluster that is partially or fully embedded in interstellar gas or dust
- ECA – (celestial object) Earth-crossing asteroid
- EGG – (celestial object) evaporating gaseous globule
- EGGR – (catalog) Eggen & Greenstein, a catalog of mostly white dwarfs
- EGP – (celestial object) extrasolar giant planet
- EGRET – (telescope) Energetic Gamma Ray Experiment Telescope, another name for the Compton Gamma Ray Observatory
- EGS – Extended Groth Strip, a deep field
- EHB – (celestial object) extreme horizontal branch, a type of hot, evolved star
- EJASA – (publication) Electronic Journal of the Astronomical Society of the Atlantic
- EKBO – (celestial object) Edgeworth–Kuiper belt object, an alternative name for Kuiper belt objects
- ELAIS – ESO large-area infrared survey – a survey
- ELAIS – (observing program) European Large Area ISO Survey, a survey of high redshift galaxies performed with the Infrared Space Observatory (ISO)
- ELF – extremely luminous far-infrared galaxy, a synonym for Ultra-Luminous infrared galaxy
- ELT – (telescope) Extremely Large Telescope
- EMP – (catalog) Ephemerides of Minor Planets
- EMP – (celestial object) extremely metal-poor, a star with few elements other than hydrogen and helium
- EMU – Evolutionary Map of the Universe
- ENACS – (observing program) ESO Nearby Abell Cluster Survey, a survey of galaxy clusters
- EPIC – (celestial object) stars and exoplanets, associated with the K2 "Second Light" plan of the Kepler space telescope
- ERO – (celestial object) extremely red object, a name applied to galaxies with red spectra
- ESA – (organization) European Space Agency
- ESO – (organization) European Southern Observatory
- ESPRESSO - (instrumentation) Echelle Spectrograph for Rocky Exoplanet- and Stable Spectroscopic Observations
- ESTEC – (organization) European Space research and TEchnology Centre
- ESTRACK – (communications network) European Space TRACKing, a network of radio antennas used for communicating to spacecraft
- ETC – exposure time calculator
- EUV – (astrophysics terminology) Extreme ultraviolet
- EUVE – (telescope) Extreme UltraViolet Explorer, an ultraviolet space telescope
- EVN – (organization) European VLBI Network

== F ==
- FAME – (telescope) Full-sky Astrometric Mapping Explorer
- FASTT – (telescope) Flagstaff Astrometric Scanning Transit Telescope
- FBOT - (celestial object) Fast blue optical transient
- FCC – (catalog) Fornax Cluster Catalog, a catalog of galaxies in the Fornax Cluster
- FEB – (celestial object) falling-evaporating body, a solid planetary object that is being evaporated by the stellar wind
- FGS – (instrumentation) fine guidance sensors, an instrument on the Hubble Space Telescope
- FHST – (instrumentation) Fixed Head Star Trackers, an instrument on the Hubble Space Telescope
- FIR – (astrophysics terminology) far infrared
- FIRST – (observing program) Faint Images of the Radio Sky at Twenty-Centimeters, a radio survey of the sky with the Very Large Array
- FIRST – (telescope) Far InfraRed and Submillimeter Space Telescope, an older name for the Herschel Space Observatory
- FIRAS – (Instrumentation) Far-InfraRed Absolute Spectrophotometer
- FIRE – (simulation project) Feedback in Realistic Environments, a project to simulate galaxy formation with detailed feedback processes included
- FITS – (software) Flexible Image Transport System, the format commonly used for scientific astronomy images
- FLAMES – (instrumentation) Fibre Large Array Multi Element Spectrograph, instrument on the VLT
- FLOAT – (telescope) Fibre-Linked Optical Array Telescope
- FLWO – (telescope) Fred L. Whipple Observatory
- FMO – (celestial object) fast moving object, an asteroid so close to the Earth that it appears to be moving very fast
- FOC – (instrumentation) Faint Object Camera, a camera formerly on the Hubble Space Telescope
- FOCAS – (instrumentation) Faint Object Camera And Spectrograph, an instrument for the Subaru Telescope
- FoM – (terminology) Figure of Merit. Used to indicate the performance of a method or device.
- FORTE – Fast On-orbit Rapid Recording of Transient Events
- FOS – (instrumentation) Faint Object Spectrograph, a spectrometer formerly on the Hubble Space Telescope
- FOV – (instrumentation) field of view
- FRB – (celestial object) fast radio burst
- FRED – (astrophysics terminology) fast rise exponential decay, the variations in the luminosity of gamma ray bursts over time
- FSC – (catalog) Faint Source Catalogue, one of the catalogs produced using Infrared Astronomical Satellite data
- FSRQ – (celestial object) Flat Spectrum Radio Quasars
- FTL – (astrophysics terminology) faster than light
- FUOR – (celestial object) FU Orionis objects, a class of variable pre–main sequence stars named after FU Orionis, the archetype for the class
  - also FU
- FUSE – (telescope) Far Ultraviolet Spectroscopic Explorer, an ultraviolet space telescope
- FUVITA – (instrumentation) Far UltraViolet Imaging Telescope Array, an ultraviolet imager for the Spectrum-Roentgen-Gamma mission
- FWHM – (instrumentation) full width at half maximum, a telescope resolution
- FWZI – (instrumentation) full width at zero intensity, a telescopes resolution

== G ==
- G – (catalog) Giclas, a catalog of nearby stars
- GAIA – (telescope) Global Astrometric Interferometer for Astrophysics, a space telescope that is used to make high-precision measurements of stars
- GALEX – (telescope) Galaxy Evolution Explorer, an ultraviolet space telescope
  - GALEXASC – GALaxy Evolution eXplorer all-sky catalog
- GASP – (software) Guide star Astrometric Support Package
- GAT – (catalog) AO (Gatewood+), catalog of G. Gatewood's observations
- GBM – (instrumentation) Gamma-Ray Burst Monitor, a set of gamma ray detectors on the Fermi Gamma-Ray Space Telescope
- GBT – (telescope) Green Bank Telescope
- GC – (catalog) General Catalog, a catalog of clusters, nebulae, and galaxies created by John Herschel and now superseded by the New General Catalogue, also globular cluster
- GCAS – (celestial object) Gamma CASsiopeiae, a class of eruptive variable stars named after Gamma Cassiopeiae, the archetype for the class
- GCMS – (instrumentation) – Gas Chromatograph and Mass Spectrometer, an instrument on the Huygens probe
  - also GC/MS
- GCN – (organization) GRB Coordinates Network
- GCR – (astrophysics terminology) galactic cosmic rays
- GCVS – (catalog) the General Catalog of Variable Stars
- GD – (catalog) Giclas Dwarf, a catalog of white dwarf
- GDS – (celestial object) Great Dark Spot, a transient feature in the clouds of Neptune
- GEM – (observing program) Galactic Emission Mapping
- GEM – (observing program) Galileo Europa Mission, the science observation program of Europa performed by the Galileo spacecraft
- GEM – (observing program) Giotto Extended Mission, the extended operations of the Giotto spacecraft
- GEMS – (organization) Group Evolution Multi-wavelength Study
- GEMS – (survey) Galaxy Evolution from Morphology and Spectral energy distributions
- GEMSS – (organization) Global Exoplanet M-dwarf Search-Survey, a search for exoplanets around m-dwarf stars
- GEODDS – (telescope) Ground-based Electro-Optical Deep Space Surveillance, a network of telescopes used in a United States Air Force program for observing space junk
- GEOS – (organization) Groupe Européen Observations Stellaires, an amateur and professional association for study of variable stars.
- GERLUMPH – (instrumentation) GPU-Enabled, High Resolution MicroLensing Parameter survey, where GPU is an acronym for Graphics Processing Unit.
- GH – (catalog) Giclas Hyades, a catalog of stars in the Hyades cluster
- GHRS – (instrumentation) Goddard High Resolution Spectrograph, a spectrograph on the Hubble Space Telescope
  - also HRS
- GIA – (organization) Gruppo Italiano Astrometristi
- GIMI – (instrumentation) Global Imaging Monitor of the Ionosphere, an ultraviolet imager on the Advanced Research and Global Observation Satellite
- GJ – (catalog) Gliese & Jahreiß/Jahreiss nearby star catalog
- GL – (catalog) Gliese nearby star catalog
- GLAST – (telescope) Gamma-ray Large Area Space Telescope
- GLIMPSE – (observing program) Galactic Legacy Infrared Mid-Plane Survey Extraordinaire
- GMC – (celestial object) Giant molecular cloud
- GMF – (celestial object) Galactic magnetic field
- GMRT – (telescope) – Giant Metrewave Radio Telescope - Pune, India
- GMT – (telescope) – Giant Magellan Telescope, a telescope being built by a US-Australian collaboration
- GONG – (organization) Global Oscillation Network Group, an organization that monitors oscillations in the Sun
- GOLD – Global-scale Observations of the Limb and Disk
- GOODS – (survey) Great Observatories Origins Deep Survey a survey of various redshifts to study galactic formation and evolution
- GP – (astrophysics terminology) giant pulses, a type of observed pulse emission from pulsars
- GPS – (astrophysics terminology) GHz-peaked spectrum, the radio or microwave spectra of some galaxies
- GR – (astrophysics terminology) general relativity
- GR – (catalog) Giclas Red dwarf, a catalog of red dwarfs
- GRB – (celestial object) gamma ray burst
- GRO – (telescope) Gamma Ray Observatory, another name for the Compton Gamma Ray Observatory
- GROSCE – (telescope) Gamma Ray Burst Optical Counterparts Search Experiment, an automated telescope used to detect the optical counterparts to gamma ray bursts
- GRS – (instrumentation) Gamma Ray Spectrometer, an instrument on the Mars Observer
- GRS – (celestial object) Great Red Spot, a feature in the clouds of Jupiter
- GRAND - Giant Radio Array for Neutrino Detection, a proposed next-generation observatory of ultra-high-energy neutrinos, cosmic rays, and gamma rays of cosmic origin plit into ~ 20 sub-arrays of 10,000 antennas located in different locations across the Earth, in radio-quiet environments with easy access, and favorable topographies
- GSC – (catalog) Guide Star Catalog, a catalog of stars used for pointing the Hubble Space Telescope
- GSC2 – (catalog) Guide Star Catalog version 2, a catalog of stars used for pointing the Hubble Space Telescope
  - also GSC II
- GSFC – (organization) Goddard Space Flight Center, a NASA institution
- GSPC – (catalog) Guide Star Photometric Catalog, a catalog of stars with precisely measured fluxes used to calibrate the Guide Star Catalog
- GTC – (telescope) Gran Telescopio Canarias, the 10.4 m reflecting telescope on the island of La Palma, Canary Islands, Spain
- GW – (celestial object) – Gravitational Wave.

== H ==
- HAeBe – (celestial object) Herbig AeBe star, a type of pre-main-sequence star with strong spectral emission lines
  - HAe – (celestial object) Herbig Ae star
  - HBe – (celestial object) Herbig Be star
- HALCA – (telescope) Highly Advanced Laboratory for Communications and Astronomy, a satellite that is part of the VLBI Space Observatory Program, a Japanese radio astronomy project
- HAO – (organization) high-altitude observatory
- HARPS – (instrumentation) High Accuracy Radial velocity Planet Searcher, a high-precision spectrograph installed on the ESO 3.6 m Telescope
- HASI – (instrumentation) Huygens Atmosphere Structure Instrument, an instrument on the Huygens probe
- HB – (celestial object) horizontal branch, a type of evolved red giant star in which helium is burned in the core and hydrogen is burned in a shell around the core
- HBRP – (celestial object) High-magnetic field radio pulsar
- HBV – (catalog) Hamburg–Bergedorf Variables, a catalog of variable stars
- HBMM – (astrophysics terminology) Hydrogen-burning minimum mass
- HCG – Hickson Compact Group
- HCO – (organization) Harvard College Observatory
- HCS – (celestial object) heliospheric current sheet, the boundary where the polarity of the Sun's magnetic field changes direction
- HD – (catalog) Henry Draper, a catalog of stars
- HDE – (catalog) Henry Draper Extension, a catalog of stars
- HDF – (data/celestial object) Hubble Deep Field, an area of the sky with little foreground obscuration that was observed deeply with the Hubble Space Telescope; also the name for the data product itself
  - HDFS – Hubble Deep Field South
- HDM – (astrophysics terminology) hot dark matter, any model for structure formation in the universe that characterizes neutrinos as dark matter
- HDS – (instrumentation) High Dispersion Spectrograph, a spectrograph on the Subaru Telescope
- HE – (catalog) Hamburg/ESO Survey
- HEAO – (telescope) High Energy Astronomical Observatory, a series of X-ray and gamma ray space telescopes
- HEASARC – (organization) High Energy Astrophysics Science Archive Research Center, a NASA organization that deals with X-ray and gamma ray telescope data
- HerMES - (observing program) Herschel Multitiered Extragalactic Survey, a legacy survey of star forming galaxies using the SPIRE and PACS instrument of Herschel
- HESS – (telescope) High Energy Stereoscopic System, a telescope for detecting cosmic rays
- HET – Hobby–Eberly Telescope
- HETE – (telescope) High Energy Transient Explorer, a space telescope that performs multi-wavelength observations of gamma-ray bursts
- HF – (astrophysics terminology) High frequency
- HGA – (instrumentation) High gain antenna
- HH – (celestial object) Herbig–Haro object, objects formed when the ejecta from new stars collides with the interstellar medium
  - also HHO
- HIC – (catalog) HIPPARCOS Input Catalog, a catalog of data for the first target stars selected for observation by the Hipparcos
- HICAT – (catalog) HIPASS catalog, a catalog of HI sources, see also NHICAT
- HID – (astrophysics terminology) – hardness–intensity diagram, a type of color–magnitude diagram used in X-ray and gamma-ray astronomy
- HIP – (catalog) HIPPARCOS, the catalog of data produced by Hipparcos
- HIPASS – (Observing program) HI Parkes All-Sky Survey, survey of HI sources
- HIPPARCOS – (telescope) HIgh Precision PARallax COllecting Satellite, a space telescope specifically designed to measure distances to stars using parallax
- HISA – (astrophysical terminology) HI self-absorption region
- HIRAX – (telescope) Hydrogen Intensity and Real-time Analysis eXperiment, an interferometric array of 1024 6-meter (20ft) diameter radio telescopes to be built in South Africa
- HK – (catalog) Survey for metal-poor stars based on the strength of CaII H and K absorption lines
- HLIRG – (celestial object) Hyperluminous infrared galaxy, a galaxy that is brighter than 10^{13} solar luminosities in the infrared
- HMC – (instrumentation) Halley Multicolor Camera, an instrument on the Giotto spacecraft
- HMGB – (celestial object) High-mass gamma-ray binary, a Gamma ray-luminous binary system consisting of a compact star and a massive star
- HMPO – (celestial object) High-mass proto-stellar object
- HMXB – (celestial object) High-mass x-ray binary, an X-ray-luminous binary system consisting of a compact star and a massive star
- HOPS – The H_{2}O southern Galactic Plane Survey
- HPMS – (celestial object) high proper motion star, a star with high proper motion
- HR – (catalog) Hoffleit Bright Star
- HR – (astrophysics terminology) Hertzsprung–Russell, a diagram that compares stars' colors to their luminosities
- HRC-I – (instrumentation) High Resolution Camera, an instrument on the Chandra X-ray Observatory
- HRD – (instrumentation) High Rate Detector, an instrument on the Cassini spacecraft
- HRMS – (observing program) High Resolution Microwave Survey, a survey for microwave signals from extraterrestrial intelligence
- HRI – (instrumentation) High Resolution Imager, an instrument on the ROSAT telescope
- HSP – (instrumentation) High Speed Photometer, an instrument formerly on the Hubble Space Telescope
- HST – (telescope) Hubble Space Telescope
- HTRA – (astrophysics terminology) High time-resolution astrophysics, the observations of phenomena that vary on timescales of one second or less
- HUT – (telescope) Hopkins Ultraviolet Telescope, an ultraviolet telescope that operated from the cargo bay of the Space Shuttle
- HWO -(telescope) Habitable Worlds Observatory
- HVC – (celestial object) high-velocity cloud, an interstellar cloud with a velocity that is too high to be explained by galactic rotation
- HXD – (instrumentation) Hard X-ray Detector, an instrument on the Suzaku space telescope
- HVS – (celestial object) hypervelocity star or high velocity star

== I ==
- IAC – (organization) Instituto de Astrofisica de Canarias
- IAPPP – (organization) International Amateur/Professional Photoelectric Photometry
- IAS – (organization) Istituto di Astrofisica Spaziale
- IASY – (observing program) International Active Sun Year, the name given to a series of coordinated Sun-related observational programs performed in 1969 and 1971
- IAU – (organization) International Astronomical Union
- IAUC – (publication) IAU Circular
- IAYC – (meeting) International Astronomical Youth Camp
- IBAS – (instrumentation) – INTEGRAL Burst Alert System, an instrument on the INTEGRAL satellite
- IBIS – (instrumentation) – Imager on Board the INTEGRAL Satellite, an instrument on the INTEGRAL satellite
- IBVS – (publication) Information Bulletin on Variable Stars
- IC – (catalog) Index Catalog
- IC – (celestial object) Intracluster, either the regions between stars in star clusters or the region between galaxies in galaxy clusters
- IC - IceCube Neutrino Observatory a.k.a. IceCube, a neutrino observatory at the Amundsen–Scott South Pole Station in Antarctica
- ICE – (spacecraft) International Comet Explorer
- ICM – (celestial object) intracluster medium, is the superheated gas present at the center of a galaxy cluster
- ICQ – (publication) International Comet Quarterly
- ICRF – (astrophysics terminology) International Celestial Reference Frame, a coordinate system based on radio sources used to define the locations of objects in the sky
- ICRS – (astrophysics terminology) International Celestial Reference System, a coordinate system based on Hipparcos observations used to define the locations of objects in the sky
- IDA – (organization) International Dark-Sky Association, an organization that seeks to control light pollution
- IDP – (celestial object) Interplanetary Dust Particle, dust particles around planets or planetary bodies
- IDS – (catalog) Index Catalog of Double Stars
- IEO – (astrophysics terminology) inner-Earth object, the orbits of asteroids
- IERS – (organization) International Earth Rotation geophysical Service or International Earth rotation and Reference systems Service, an organization that monitors the Earth's orientation with respect to the radio sources used to define the ICRF
- IfA: either Institute for Astronomy (Hawaii) or Institute for Astronomy, School of Physics and Astronomy, University of Edinburgh, Scotland
- IFN – (celestial object) integrated flux nebulae, dust and gas outside the plane of the Milky Way, which are thus illuminated by the entire galaxy as opposed to a nearby star or stars
- IGM – (celestial object) intergalactic medium
- IGR – (catalog) Integral Gamma-Ray source, a catalog based on observations by the INTEGRAL telescope
- IGY – (observing program) International Geophysical Year, the name given to a series of coordinated geophysical and astronomical observation programs performed in 1957 and 1958
- IHW – (organization) International Halley Watch, an organization created to coordinate observations of Halley's Comet in 1986
- ILOM – (spacecraft) In-situ Lunar Orientation Measurement, a mission to measure variations in the orientation of the Moon from the Moon's surface
- IMAGE – Imager for Magnetopause-to-Aurora Global Exploration
- IMBH – (celestial object) intermediate mass black hole
- IMF – (astrophysics terminology) initial mass function, the relative numbers of stars of different masses that form during star formation
- IMO – (organization) International Meteor Organization
- IMPACT – (meeting) International Monitoring Programs for Asteroid and Comet Threat
- IMPS – (observing program) IRAS Minor Planet Survey
- INAG – (organization) Institut National d'Astronomie et de Geophysique
- ING – (organization) Isaac Newton Group of Telescopes
- INS – (celestial object) Isolated Neutron Star
- INT – (telescope) Isaac Newton Telescope
- INTEGRAL – (telescope) INTErnational Gamma-Ray Astrophysics Laboratory, a gamma-ray space telescope
- IoA – (organization) Institute of Astronomy, an astronomy research department at Cambridge University
- IOTA – (telescope) Infrared Optical Telescope Array
- IOTA – (organization) International Occultation Timing Association, an organization for monitoring occultations
- IPAC – (organization) Infrared Processing & Analysis Center
- IPMO – (celestial object) Isolated Planetary Mass Objects, another name for isolated planemos or sub-brown dwarfs
- IQSY – (observing program) International Quiet Sun Year, the name given to a series of coordinated Sun-related observational programs performed in 1964 and 1965
- IR – (astrophysics terminology) InfraRed
- IRAC – (instrumentation) Infrared Array Camera, a mid-infrared imager on the Spitzer Space Telescope
- IRAF – (software) Image Reduction and Analysis Facility, a general-purpose professional data-processing package
- IRAIT – (telescope) – International Robotic Antarctic Infrared Telescope
- IRAM – (organization) Institut de Radio Astronomie Millimetrique
- IRAS – (telescope/catalog) InfraRed Astronomical Satellite, an infrared space telescope; also the catalog produced using the telescope's data
- IRCS – (instrumentation) InfraRed Camera and Spectrograph, an instrument on the Subaru Telescope
- IRDC – (celestial object) Infrared Dark Cloud
- IRS – (instrumentation) InfraRed Spectrograph, an infrared spectrometer on the Spitzer Space Telescope
- IRSA – (organization) Infrared Science Archive
- IRTF – (telescope) InfraRed Telescope Facility
- IRX – (astrophysical terminology) InfraRed Excess
- ISAS – (organization) Institute of Space and Astronautical Science
- ISAS – (organization) Institute of Space and Atmospheric Studies, a research unit at the University of Saskatchewan
- ISCO – (astrophysical terminology) Innermost Stable Circular Orbit
- ISEE – (spacecraft) International Sun-Earth Explorer, a series of spacecraft designed to study the effects of the Sun on the Earth's space environment and magnetosphere
- ISGRI – (instrumentation) – INTEGRAL Soft Gamma-Ray Imager, an instrument on the INTEGRAL satellite
- ISM – (celestial object) InterStellar Medium
- ISN – (organization) International Supernovae Network
- ISO – (telescope) Infrared Space Observatory
- ISON – International Scientific Optical Network
- ISPM – (spacecraft) International Solar Polar Mission, another name for the Ulysses spacecraft
- ISRO – (organization) Indian Space Research Organisation
- ISS - (spacecraft) International Space Station
- ISSA – (data) Infrared Sky Survey Atlas, an atlas compiled from Infrared Astronomical Satellite data
- ISTeC – (organization) International Small Telescope Cooperative
- ISY – (observing program/meeting) International Space Year, the name given to a celebration of space exploration as well as a series of coordinated astronomical observations and a series of meetings to plan future astronomy research efforts
- ITA – (organization) Institute of Theoretical Astronomy, one of three organizations that was combined to form the Institute of Astronomy
- IUCAA – (organization) Inter-University Centre for Astronomy and Astrophysics - Pune, India
- IUE – (telescope) International Ultraviolet Explorer, an ultraviolet space telescope
- IUEDAC – (organization) IUE satellite Data Analysis Center
- IWCA – (meeting) International Workshop on Cometary Astronomy

== J ==
- Janskys – (publication) Green Bank Observatory
- JAC – (publication) Japan Astronomical Circular
- JAC – (organization) Joint Astronomy Centre, the organization that operates the United Kingdom Infrared Telescope and the James Clerk Maxwell Telescope
- JAPOA – (organization) Japan Amateur Photoelectric Observers Association
- JAXA – (organization) Japan Aerospace eXploration Agency
- JBO – Jodrell Bank Observatory, a radio observatory in England.
- JCMT – (telescope) James Clerk Maxwell Telescope
- JD – (astrophysics terminology) Julian Date, an alternative time commonly used in astronomy
- JET-X – (telescope) Joint European Telescope for X-ray astronomy
- JGR – (publication) Journal of Geophysical Research
- JILA – (organization) formerly Joint Institute for Laboratory Astrophysics
- JIVE – Joint Institute for VLBI in Europe
- JKT – (telescope) Jacobus Kapteyn Telescope
- JPL – (organization) Jet Propulsion Laboratory, a research center associated with NASA
- JSGA – (telescope/organization) Japan SpaceGuard Association, a Japanese telescope used to track near-Earth asteroids and space junk
- JWST – (telescope) James Webb Space Telescope, an infrared space telescope

== K ==
- KAIT – (telescope) Katzman Automatic Imaging Telescope
- KAO – (telescope) Kuiper Airborne Observatory
- KBO – (celestial object) Kuiper belt object
- KCAO – (organization) Kumamoto Civil Astronomical Observatory
- KIC – (catalog) Kepler Input Catalog, a catalog of stars with potential extrasolar planets to be observed by the Kepler Mission
- KPNO – (organization) Kitt Peak National Observatory
- KS – (astrophysics terminology) Kennicutt-Schmidt relation

== L ==
- L – (astrophysics terminology) Lagrange, Lagrange points
- L – (catalog) Luyten, a catalog of proper motion measurements of stars
- LAD-C – (instrumentation) Large Area Debris Collector, a canceled program that was to collect and catalog low orbital dust on the International Space Station
- LAEFF – (organization) Laboratorio de Astrofisica Espacial y Fisica Fundamental, a Spanish astronomy research organization
- LAL – (catalog) LALande, a historical catalog of stars
- LAMOST – (telescope) Large sky Area Multi-Object fiber Spectroscopic Telescope
- LANL – (organization) Los Alamos National Laboratory
- LASCO – (instrumentation) Large Angle and Spectrometric COronagraph, an instrument on the Solar and Heliospheric Observatory
- Laser – (instrumentation) light amplification by stimulated emission of radiation
- LAT – (instrumentation) Large Area Telescope, on the Fermi Gamma-ray Space Telescope
- LBN – (catalog) Lynds Bright Nebula, a catalog of bright nebulae
- LBG - (celestial object) Lyman Break Galaxy, a galaxy identified using the Lyman-break selection technique
- LBNL – (organization) Lawrence Berkeley National Laboratory
- LBT – (telescope) Large Binocular Telescope
- LBV – (celestial object) luminous blue variable, a type of very bright variable star
- LCDM – (astrophysics terminology) Lambda cold dark matter, any model for structure formation in the universe that includes dark energy
  - also ΛCDM
- LCO — (observatory) Las Campanas Observatory, Atacama Region in Chile
- LCOGT – network of autonomous robotic telescopes (2m, 1m and 40 cm) at 7 sites in both hemispheres
- LCROSS – (spacecraft) Lunar CRater Observation and Sensing Satellite
- LCRS – (observing program) Las Campanas Redshift Survey
- LDN – (catalog) Lynds Dark Nebula, a catalog of dark nebulae
- LDN – (celestial object) large dark nebula, a large, wispy nebula made of neutral brown hydrogen gas.
- LDS – (catalog) Luyten Double Star
- LDSS3 — (spectrograph) Low Dispersion Survey Spectrograph, from Magellan 2 Clay Telescope at LCO.
- LEO – (astrophysics terminology) low Earth orbit
- LEST – (telescope) large Earth-based solar telescope
- LETGS – (instrumentation) Low Energy Transmission Gratings Spectrometer, an instrument on the Chandra X-Ray Observatory
  - also LETG
- LF – (astrophysics terminology) luminosity function, the spatial density of objects such as star clusters and galaxies as a function of their luminosity
- LFT – (catalog) Luyten Five-Tenths, a catalog of stars with proper motions exceeding 0.5"
- LGA – (instrumentation) low-gain antenna
- LGM – (celestial object) Little Green Men, a humorous name applied to pulsars soon after their discovery
- LHEA – (organization) Laboratory for High Energy Astrophysics
- LHS – (catalog) Luyten Half-Second, a catalog of stars with proper motions exceeding 0.5"
- LIC – (celestial object) Local Interstellar Cloud, the cloud in the interstellar medium through which the Solar System is currently moving
- LIGO – (telescope) Laser Interferometer Gravitational Wave Observatory, an instrument for detecting gravitational waves
- LINEAR – (observing program) Lincoln Near-Earth Asteroid Research
- LINER – (celestial object) low-ionization nuclear emission region, a galactic nucleus that is characterized by spectral line emission from weakly ionized gas
- LIRG – (celestial object) luminous infrared galaxy, a galaxy that is between 10^{11} and 10^{12} solar luminosities in the infrared
- LISA – (telescope) Laser Interferometer Space Antenna, a series of spacecraft that can be used to detect gravitational waves
- LLAGN – (celestial object) low-luminosity active galactic nucleus, an active galactic nucleus with a low luminosity
- LLNL – (organization) Lawrence Livermore National Laboratory
- LMC – (celestial object) Large Magellanic Cloud, an irregular galaxy near the Milky Way
- LMS – (celestial object) Lower main sequence star, the less massive hydrogen-burning main-sequence stars
- LMXB – (celestial object) low-mass x-ray binary, an X-ray-luminous binary star system in which one of the stars is a neutron star or black hole that is stripping material away from the other star in the system
- LN2 – (instrumentation) liquid nitrogen
- LOAN – Longitude of ascending node
- LOFAR – (telescope) LOw Frequency ARray, for radio astronomy
- LONEOS – (observing program) Lowell Observatory Near-Earth Object Search
- LOSS – (observing program) Lick Observatory Supernova Search
- LOTIS – (telescope) Livermore Optical Transient Imaging System, a telescope designed to find the optical counterparts of gamma ray bursts
- LOTOSS – (observing program) Lick Observatory and Tenagra Observatory Supernova Searches
- LP – (catalog) Luyten Palomar, a catalog of proper motion measurements of stars
- LPI – (organization) Lunar and Planetary Institute
- LPL – (organization) Lunar and Planetary Laboratory, the planetary science department of the University of Arizona
- LPV – (celestial object) Long Period Variable, a type of variable star that changes in brightness slowly over time
- LRG – (celestial object) luminous red galaxy, a dataset of galaxies from the Sloan Digital Sky Survey that were selected on the basis of their red colors
- LRO – (spacecraft) Lunar Reconnaissance Orbiter
- LSR – (astrophysics terminology) local standard of rest, the frame of reference with a velocity equal to the average velocity of all the stars in the solar neighborhood, including the Sun
- LSST – (telescope) Large Synoptic Survey Telescope, old name for the Vera C. Rubin Observatory
- LSST – (observing program) Legacy Survey of Space and Time, the main survey carried out by the Vera C. Rubin Observatory
- LST – (astrophysics terminology) local sidereal time, the right ascension that is currently at the zenith
- LT – (telescope) Liverpool Telescope
- LTE – (astrophysics terminology) Local Thermodynamic Equilibrium, a state where variations in temperature, pressure, etc. do not vary on small scales
- LTP – (astrophysics terminology) Lunar Transient Phenomenon, an observed event (such as a flash of light) on the surface of the Moon
- LTT – (catalog) Luyten Two-Tenths, a catalog of proper motion measurements for stars
- LWS - (instrumentation) Long Wavelength Spectrometer, a spectrometer on the ISO

== M ==
- MARVEL – (project) Multi-object Apache Point Observatory Radial Velocity Exoplanet Large-area Survey, a NASA-funded project to search for exoplanets
- M – (catalog) Messier
- M – (celestial object) Mira, a class of long period pulsating variable stars named after Mira, the archetype for the class
- MAC – (observing program) Multi-instrument Aircraft Campaign, a program to study the cometary dust from the Leonids meteor showers
- MACHO – (celestial object/observing program/catalog) MAssive Compact Halo Object, an object in the Milky Way's halo thought to comprise part of the galaxy's dark matter; also a survey to detect these sources through gravitational lensing and the catalog of sources detected by the survey
- MACS – (catalogue) Magellanic Catalogue of Stars
- MAGIC – (telescope) Major Atmospheric Gamma-ray Imaging Cherenkov telescope
- MALT – Millimetre Astronomy Legacy Team – including and MALT45
- MAP – (telescope) Microwave-background Anisotropy Probe, an older name for the Wilkinson Microwave Anisotropy Probe
- MASER – (astrophysics terminology) microwave amplification by stimulated emission of radiation, microwave emission that is similar to the optical emission from a laser
- MAVEN – Mars Atmosphere and Volatile EvolutioN
- MBA – (celestial object) main belt asteroid
- MBH – (celestial object) massive black hole
- MCG – (catalog) Morphological Catalog of Galaxies
- MCMC - (astrophysics terminology) Markov chain Monte Carlo
- MCO – (spacecraft) Mars Climate Orbiter
- MDS – (observing program) Medium Deep Survey, a survey of high-redshift galaxies with the Hubble Space Telescope
- MECO – (celestial object) magnetospheric eternally collapsing object, a type of object proposed as an alternative to supermassive black holes as the central compact source within active galactic nuclei
- MeerKAT - (telescope) originally the Karoo Array Telescope, a radio telescope consisting of 64 antennas in the Meerkat National Park, in the Northern Cape of South Africa
- MEGARA – (instrumentation) Multi-Espectrógrafo en GTC de Alta Resolución para Astronomía, an instrument on the Gran Telescopio Canarias
- MEPAG – (organization) Mars Exploration Program Analysis Group
- MEPCO – (meeting) Meeting of European Planetary and Cometary Observers
- MER – (spacecraft) Mars Exploration Rover
- MERLIN – Multi Element Radio Linked Interferometer. A seven-telescope radio interferometer
- MESSENGER – MErcury Surface, Space ENvironment, GEochemistry and Ranging
- MGC – (catalog/observing program) Millennium Galaxy Catalogue
- MGS – (spacecraft) Mars Global Surveyor
- MHD – (astrophysics terminology) MagnetoHydroDynamic
- MICO – (software) Multi-year Interactive Computer Almanac, astronomy almanac software created by the United States Naval Observatory
- MIDI – MID-Infrared instrument. A mid-infrared instrument of the VLTI
- MIPS – (instrumentation) Multi-band Imaging Photometer, an instrument on the Spitzer Space Telescope
- MIRI – (instrumentation) Mid-Infrared Instrument, an instrument on the James Webb Space Telescope
- MJD – (astrophysics terminology) Modified Julian Date, the Julian date minus 2400000.5
- MLO – (organization)
- MMO – (spacecraft) Mercury Magnetospheric Orbiter, JAXA space probe to Mercury
- MMR – (astrophysics terminology) Mean-Motion Resonance
- MMS – Magnetospheric Multiscale Mission
- MMSN – Minimum Mass Solar Nebula
- MMT – (telescope) Multiple Mirror Telescope
- MNRAS – (publication) Monthly Notices of the Royal Astronomical Society
- MO – (spacecraft) Mars Observer
- MOA – (observing program) Microlensing Observations in Astrophysics, a survey searching for gravitational lenses
- MOC – (instrumentation) Mars Observer Camera, an instrument on the Mars Observer
- MOID – (astrophysics terminology) minimum orbit intersection distance, the minimum distance between two objects' orbital paths
- MOLA – (instrumentation) Mars Observer Laser Altimeter, an instrument on the Mars Observer used to study Mars's topology
- MOND – (astrophysics terminology) modified Newtonian dynamics
- MONS – (telescope) Measuring Oscillations in Nearby Stars, a Danish space telescope that was proposed and designed but not built
- MOST – (telescope) Microvariability and Oscillations of STars, a space telescope designed to detect oscillations in the atmospheres of stars and extrasolar planetss in orbit around other stars
- MOST – (telescope) Molonglo Observatory Synthesis Telescope, an Australian radio telescope
- MOTIF – (telescope) Maui Optical Tracking and Identification Facility
- MOXE – (instrumentation) Monitoring X-ray Experiment, an X-ray all-sky monitor designed for the Spectrum-X-Gamma satellite
- MPC – (publication) Minor Planet Circulars (also called Minor Planets and Comets)
- MPEC – (publication) Minor Planet Electronic Circular
- MPF – (spacecraft) Mars PathFinder
- MPL – (spacecraft) Mars Polar Lander
- MPO – (space craft) Mercury Planetary Orbiter, ESA space craft to Mercury
- MPP – (instrumentation) Multi-Pinned-Phase, CCD technology that reduces dark current noise
- MPCS – (publication) Minor Planet Circulars Supplement
- MPS – (observing project) Microlensing Planet Search, a program designed that detect extrasolar planets using a gravitational lensing technique
- MRI – (astrophysics term) magnetorotational instability, a local instability in the accretion disks which only requires weak magnetic field and dΩ^{2}/dR<0
- MRK – Markarian galaxies
- MRO – (spacecraft) Mars Reconnaissance Orbiter
- MSL – Mars Science Laboratory
- MSP – (celestial object) millisecond pulsar
- MSSS – (organization) Maui Space Surveillance Site
- MSX – (telescope) Midcourse Space EXperiment, an infrared space telescope
- MSSSO – (organization) Mount Stromlo and Siding Spring Observatories
- MUNICS – (observing program) MUnich Near-Infrared Cluster Survey
- MUSES – (spacecraft) MU Space Engineering Spacecraft, a Japanese science-related spacecraft launched in a Mu rocket
- MUSTANG – (instrumentation) Multiplexed SQUID TES Array at Ninety GHz, A bolometer camera on the Green Bank Telescope.
- MUSYC – (observing program) Multi-wavelength Survey by Yale-Chile
- MW – (celestial object) Milky Way
- MWD – (celestial object) magnetic white dwarf
- MXRB – (celestial object) massive x-ray binary, an x-ray-luminous binary system consisting of a compact star and a very massive star
- MYSO – (celestial object) massive young stellar object

== N ==
- N – (celestial object) nova
- NACA – (organization) National Advisory Committee on Aeronautics, the older name for NASA
- NAMN – (organization) North American Meteor Network
- NAOJ – (organization) National Astronomical Observatory of Japan
- NAS – (organization) Norsk Astronomisk Selskap, the Norwegian name for the Norwegian Astronomical Society
- NASA – (organization) National Aeronautics and Space Administration
- NASDA – (organization) NAtional Space Development Agency
- NBS – (organization) National Bureau of Standards, an older name for the National Institute of Standards and Technology
- NCT – (telescope) Nuclear Compton Telescope – a balloon-borne soft gamma-ray (0.2-15 MeV) telescope.
- NEAP – (spacecraft) Near Earth Asteroid Prospector, a space probe used to study a near-Earth asteroid
- NEAR – (spacecraft) Near Earth Asteroid Rendezvous, a space probe used to study a near-Earth asteroid
- NEAT – (observing program) Near-Earth Asteroid Tracking
- NED – (software) NASA/IPAC Extragalactic Database
- NEO – (celestial object) Near-Earth object
  - also NEA – (celestial object) Near-Earth asteroid
- NEID - (instrumentation) a nested acronym for NN-EXPLORE Exoplanet Investigations with Doppler Spectroscopy, and it gets its name from the Tohono O'odham word meaning "to see"
- NEMP – (celestial object) nitrogen-enhanced metal-poor star, a type of carbon star with high amounts of nitrogen
- NEODyS – (organization) Near Earth Objects Dynamic Site, an Italian web-based service that provides information on near-Earth asteroids
- NEOIC – (organization) Near Earth Object Information Center, a United Kingdom organization that provides information on near-Earth asteroids
- NEOWISE – Near-Earth Object WISE
- NESS – (telescope) Near Earth Space Surveillance, a telescope for observing near-Earth asteroids
- NESSI – (organization) Near Earth Space Surveillance Initiative, a collaboration planning to use a ground-based telescope to observe near-Earth asteroids
- NGC – (catalog) New General Catalog
- NGS-POSS – National Geographic Society – Palomar Observatory Sky Survey
- NGST – (telescope) Next Generation Space Telescope, an older name for the James Webb Space Telescope
- ngVLA – (telescope) Next-Generation Very Large Array
- NHICAT – (catalog) Northern HIPASS CATalog, the northern extension of the HIPASS catalogue
- NICER - (telescope) Neutron Star Interior Composition Explorer, a NASA telescope on the International Space Station
- NICMOS – (instrumentation) Near Infrared Camera / Multi Object Spectrometer, an infrared instrument on the Hubble Space Telescope
- NIMS – (instrumentation) Near-Infrared Mapping Spectrometer, an instrument on the Galileo spacecraft
- NIR – (astrophysics terminology) near-infrared
- NIRCam – (Instrument), Near-Infrared Camera, an instrument on James Webb Telescope
- NIRSpec – (instrument) Near-Infrared Spectrograph, an instrument on James Webb Telerscope
- NIST – (organization) National Institute of Standards and Technology
- NLAGN – (celestial object) Narrow-Line AGN, classified based on lack of broadened emission or absorption lines in spectra
- NLR – (astrophysics term) the Narrow Line Region of the AGN
- NLTE – (astrophysics terminology) non-local thermodynamic equilibrium, situations where the temperature, pressure, etc. of a system are not in equilibrium
- NLTT – (catalog) New Luyten Two-Tenths, a catalog of stars with high proper motions
- NN-Explore - (Observing program) NASA-NSF Exoplanet Observational Research
- NNVS – Nizhny Novgorod, Veränderliche Sterne; a variable star publication of the Nizhny Novgorod Society of Physics and Astronomy Amateurs
- NOAA – (organization) National Oceanic and Atmospheric Administration
- NOAO – (organization) National Optical Astronomy Observatories
- NODO – (telescope) NASA Orbital Debris Observatory, a now-defunct telescope used to observe space junk and other objects
- NOT – (telescope) NOrdic Telescope
- NPS – (celestial object) North Polar Sequence, a series of stars near the north celestial pole once used as standards for measuring magnitudes
- NRAL – Nuffield Radio Astronomy Laboratory, the former name for Jodrell
- NRAO – (organization) National Radio Astronomy Observatory
- NRL – (organization) Naval Research Laboratory
- NS – (celestial object) neutron star
- NSF – (organization) National Science Foundation
- NSO – (organization) National Solar Observatory
- NSSDC – (organization) National Space Science Data Center
- NSV – (catalog) New Suspected Variable, a catalog of variable stars
- NT – (astrophysics terminology) Non-Thermal, radiation that is not related to the emission source's temperature (such as synchrotron radiation)
- NTT – (telescope) New Technology Telescope, a telescope operated by the European Southern Observatory
- NuSTAR – Nuclear Spectroscopic Telescope Array
- NVSS – NRAO VLA Sky Survey, a major survey

== O ==
- OAO – (observatory) Okayama Astrophysical Observatory, in Japan
- OAO – (telescope) Orbiting Astronomical Observatory, a series of satellites with astronomical instruments that operated in the 1970s
- OC – (celestial object) open cluster, a cluster of stars
- OCA – (organization) Observatoire de la Côte d'Azur
- OCO – (celestial object) Oort Cloud Object, an object (usually a comet) in the Oort cloud
- OGLE – (observing program/catalog) Optical Gravitational Lensing Experiment, an observing program to survey the sky for microlensing events; also the catalog of sources produced by the project
  - BLG – (catalog) BuLGe, used to designate a source detected in the direction of the bulge of the Milky Way
  - TR – (catalog) TRansit, used to designate a potential observation of a microlensing event caused by a transiting star
- OPAG – (organization) Outer Planets Assessment Group, a group established by NASA that provides advice on Solar System exploration
- ORFEUS – (telescope) Orbiting and Retrievable Far and Extreme Ultraviolet Spectrometer, an ultraviolet space telescope that could be released and later retrieved by the Space Shuttle
- OSIRIS-REx – Origins Spectral Interpretation Resource Identification Security Regolith Explorer
- OSS – (observing program) Ohio Sky Survey
- OSSE – (instrumentation) Oriented Scintillation Spectrometer Experiment, an instrument on the Compton Gamma Ray Observatory
- OTA – (instrumentation) Optical Telescope Assembly, the optics of the Hubble Space Telescope
- OVV – (celestial object) an optically violent variable quasar.
- OWL – (telescope) orbiting wide-angle light-collectors, two satellites that will work together to observe cosmic rays hitting the Earth's atmosphere
- OWL – (telescope) OverWhelmingly Large Telescope, a proposed telescope with a primary mirror with a width of 100 m

== P ==
- P60 – (telescope) Palomar 60-inch telescope
- PA – (astrophysics terminology) Position Angle
- PACS - (instrumentation) Photodetecting Array Camera and Spectrometer, a Herschel imaging camera and low resolution spectrometer
- PAH – (astrophysics terminology) polycyclic aromatic hydrocarbon
- PAMELA – (telescope) Payload for Antimatter Matter Exploration and Light-nuclei Astrophysics, a space telescope used to study cosmic rays
- Pan-STARRS – (telescope) Panoramic Survey Telescope And Rapid Response System
- PASJ – (publication) Publications of the Astronomical Society of Japan
- PBH — (cosmological object) Primordial black hole
- PASP – (publication) Publications of the Astronomical Society of the Pacific
- PCA – (instrumentation) Proportional Counter Array, an X-ray detector on the Rossi X-ray Timing Explorer
- PCAS – (observing program) Planet-Crossing Asteroid Survey
- PDBI – (telescope) Plateau de Bure Interferometer, a radio telescope
- PDR – a photodissociation region or photon-dominated region (both terms are used synonymously); a region in the neutral ISM in which far-ultraviolet photons dominate the heating and chemistry
- PDS – is a distributed data system that NASA uses to archive data collected by Solar System missions.
- PEP – (instrumentation) PhotoElectric Photometry, an observing technique using photometers
- PEPE – (instrumentation) Plasma Experiment for Planetary Exploration, an instrument on Deep Space 1
- PGC – Principal Galaxies Catalogue
- PHA – (celestial object) Potentially Hazardous Asteroid
- PI – (person) Principal Investigator, the person who leads a scientific project
- PK – (catalog) Perek-Kohoutek, a catalog of planetary nebulae
- PKS – (Telescope) Refers to Parkes Observatory, a radio telescope in Australia
- Planemo – (celestial object) planetary mass object
- PLANET – (observing program) Probing Lensing Anomalies NETwork, a program to search for microlensing events
- PLS – (observing program) Palomar-Leiden Survey, a program to search for asteroids
- PMPS – (observing program) Parkes Multibeam Pulsar Survey
- PMS – (celestial object) pre-main sequence, young stars that are still in the process of formation
  - also pre-MS
- PMT – (instrumentation) photomultiplier tube
- P-L – a set of asteroid discoveries in the 1960s
- PN – (celestial object) planetary nebula
  - also PNe (plural form of planetary nebula)
- PNG – (catalog) Galactic Planetary Nebula
- PNLF – (astrophysics terminology) Planetary Nebula Luminosity Function, the density of planetary nebula as a function of their luminosity
- PNN – (celestial object) planetary nebula nucleus, the central star in a planetary nebula
- PNNV – (celestial object) planetary nebula nucleus variable, a variable star in the center of a planetary nebula
- POSS – (observing program) Palomar Observatory Sky Survey
- POSSUM – Polarisation Sky Survey of the Universe's Magnetism
- PPARC – (organization) Particle Physics and Astronomy Research Council, a major government-sponsored science agency in the United Kingdom, merged into the Science and Technology Facilities Council in 2007
- PPM – (catalog) Positions and Proper Motions, a catalog of the positions and proper motions of stars
- PPN – (celestial object) proto-planetary nebula, an object that has partially evolved from a red giant to a planetary nebula
- PRE – (astrophysics terminology) photospheric radius expansion
- PRIMUS – Prism Multi-Object Survey, a large [spectroscopsurvey]
- Proplyd – (celestial object) protoplanetary disk
- PSC – (catalog) Point Source Catalog, a catalog of point-like infrared sources detected with the Infrared Astronomy Satellite
- PSF – (instrumentation) Point Spread Function, a function that describes the blurring of a point source that is caused by the optics of the telescope and instrument (as well as other effects)
- PSI – (organization) Planetary Science Institute
- PSN – (catalog) Possible Supernova.
- PSR – (celestial object) Pulsar
- PVO – (spacecraft) Pioneer Venus Orbiter
- PVTEL – (celestial object) PV TELescopii, a class of pulsating variable stars named after PV Telescopii, the archetype for the class
- PWD – (celestial object) pre-white dwarf, a star that no longer creates energy through fusion that will eventually evolve into a white dwarf
- PWN – (celestial object) pulsar wind nebula
- PZT – (telescope) photographic zenith tube, a general name for any telescope designed to observe objects passing at the zenith

== Q ==
- QBO – (astrophysics terminology) quasi-biennial oscillation, a type of season variation in the Earth's atmosphere
- QGP - Quark-Gluon Plasma
- QE – (instrumentation) quantum efficiency, the sensitivity of CCDs
- QPO – (astrophysics terminology) quasi-periodic oscillation
- QSO – (celestial object) quasi-stellar object
- Quasar – (celestial object) quasi-stellar radio source

== R ==
- RAPTOR – Rapid Telescopes for Optical Response project
- RA – (astrophysics terminology) Right ascension
- RAFGL – See AFGL.
- RAMBO – (celestial object) An association of brown dwarfs or white dwarfs form a dark cluster.
- RAS – (organization) Royal Astronomical Society
- RASC – (organization) Royal Astronomical Society of Canada
- RASS – (observing program/catalog) ROSAT All-Sky Survey, used as both a name for a survey with ROSAT and the catalogs produced from the survey
- RC – (celestial object) Red Clump, a type of metal-rich red giant star
  - also RCG – red clump giant
- RC – (catalog) Reference Catalogue, a catalog of nearby galaxies
  - RC2 – Reference Catalogue, 2nd edition
  - RC3 – Reference Catalogue, 3rd edition
- RC – (organization/telescope) Ritchey Chretien, a manufacturer of amateur and professional telescope equipment; also the telescopes themselves
- RCB – (celestial object) R Coronae Borealis, a class of eruptive variable stars named after R Coronae Borealis, the archetype for the class
- RDI – (astrophysics terminology) radiation-driven implosion
- RECONS – (organization) Research Consortium on Nearby Stars, a survey of nearby stars
- RGB – (celestial object) red-giant branch, a star that is evolving from a main-sequence star into a red giant
  - Can also refer to the ROSAT-Green Bank Catalog
- RGO – (organization) Royal Greenwich Observatory
- RLOF – (astrophysics terminology) Roche Lobe Overflow, the result of when an object in a binary system is larger than its roche lobe (i.e. when an object in a binary system expands to a radius where tidal forces become stronger than gravitational forces)
- RLQ – (celestial object) radio loud quasar, a quasar that produces strong radio emission
- RNGC – (catalog) Revised New General Catalog
- RORF – (astrophysics terminology) radio/optical reference frame, an inertial reference frame based on extragalactic radio sources
- ROSAT – (telescope) ROentgen SATellite, an X-ray space telescope
- ROTSE – (observing program/telescope) Robotic Optical Transient Search Experiment, an observing program for detecting the optical counterparts of gamma ray bursts; also the telescopes used in this program
- RQQ – (celestial object) radio-quiet quasar a quasar that produces weak radio emission
- RRAT – (celestial object) rotating radio transient, a population of rotating neutron stars that produce periodic bursts of emission that are separated by intervals of minutes or hours
- RRL – (celestial object) RR Lyrae, a class of pulsating variable stars named after RR Lyrae, the archetype of the class
  - also RR
- RSA – (catalog) Revised Shapley-Ames, a catalog of nearby galaxies
- RSA – (organization) Russian Space Agency
- RSAA – (organization) Research School of Astronomy and Astrophysics, part of the Institute of Advanced Studies at the Australian National University
- RSG – (celestial object) red super giant
- RSN – (celestial object) radio supernova
- RTG – (instrumentation) Radioisotope Thermoelectric Generator, a type of power generator used in spacecraft that travel far from the Sun
- RV – (astrophysics terminology) radial velocity, the velocity along the line of sight
- RX – (catalog) ROSAT X-ray, a catalog of sources detected by ROSAT
- RXTE – (telescope) Rossi X-Ray Timing Explorer, a space telescope designed to observe variability in X-ray emission

== S ==
- S82 – Stripe 82
- S&T – (publication) Sky & Telescope
- SAAO – (organization) South African Astronomical Observatory
- SALT – (telescope) Southern African Large Telescope
- SAF – (organization) Société astronomique de France (French Astronomical Society)
- SAM – (astrophysics terminology) Semi-Analytic Modeling, models that draw on numerical and analytical methods to model dark matter evolution in galaxies
- SAO – (organization/catalog) Smithsonian Astrophysical Observatory, the name of astrophysics research organization associated with Harvard University; also a catalog of stars
- SARA – (organization) Society of Amateur Radio Astronomers
- SAS – (software) Science Analysis Software, a software package used for processing data from the XMM-Newton Observatory
- SAT – (telescope) synthetic aperture telescope
- SAVAL – (organization) Sociedad Astronómica de Valparaíso y Viña del Mar, Chile. Amateur Astronomy. Founded in 1956.
- SB – (celestial object) spectroscopic binary
  - SB1 – spectroscopic binary, single-lined spectra
  - SB2 – spectroscopic binary, double-lined spectra
- SB – (astrophysics terminology) surface brightness
- SBIG – (organization/instrumentation) Santa Barbara Instrument Group, the name of both a company that manufactures telescope equipment and the company's products
- SBNC – (organization) Small Bodies Names Committee, an older name for the Committee for Small Body Nomenclature
- SCP – (observing program) Supernova Cosmology Project, a project to measure the expansion of the universe using supernovae at high redshifts
- SCR – (observing program) SuperCOSMOS-RECONS, a survey that measured the proper motions of stars
- SCT – (telescope) Schmidt–Cassegrain telescope, a general name for a type of compact telescope that uses both lenses and mirrors
- SCUBA – (instrumentation) Submillimetre Common User Bolometer Array, a submillimeter imager formerly at the James Clerk Maxwell Telescope
- SCUBA-2 – (instrumentation) Submillimetre Common User Bolometer Array 2, a submillimeter imager that will replace SCUBA
- sd – (celestial object) subdwarf, stars fainter than main-sequence stars with the same colors; often used as a prefix to a star's spectral type
- SDO – (celestial object) scattered disk object, Kuiper belt objects with highly eccentric, highly inclined orbits
  - also SKBO – Scattered Kuiper belt object
- SDOR – (celestial object) S DORadus, a class of eruptive variable stars named after S Doradus, the archetype for the class
- SDSS – (observing program/catalog) Sloan Digital Sky Survey, a large imaging and spectroscopic survey; also the catalog of sources from the survey
- SDSSp – (catalog) Sloan Digital Sky Survey provisory / preliminary
- SEAAN – (organization) Southeast Asia Astronomy Network, astronomy research and education among Southeast Asian countries
- SED – (astrophyics terminology) Spectral Energy Distribution
- SEDS – (organization) Students for the Exploration and Development of Space
- SERC – (organization) Science and Engineering Research Council
- SEST – (telescope) Swedish–ESO Submillimetre Telescope
- SETI – (observing program) Search for Extra-Terrestrial Intelligence
- SF – (astrophysics terminology) star formation
- SFH – (astrophysics terminology) star formation history
- SFR – (astrophyics terminology) star formation rate
- SGF – (organization) – SpaceGuard Foundation, an organization that tracks near-Earth asteroids
- SGR – (celestial object) – soft gamma repeater, a type of neutron star with strong magnetic fields that produces very large bursts of energy
- SGRB – (celestial object) – Short Gamma-Ray Burst.
- SHOES-Supernovae, HO, for the Equation of State of Dark energy
- SID – (astrophysics terminology) Sudden Ionospheric Disturbance, a disturbance in the Earth's ionosphere caused by the Sun
- SIDC – (organization) Sunspot Index Data Center
- SIM – (telescope) Space Interferometry Mission, a planned optical space telescope that will be used to measure distances to stars
- SIMBAD – (software) Set of Identifications, Measurements, and Bibliography for Astronomical Data, a website that provides catalog data on astronomical objects
- SINGG – (observing program) Survey of Ionization in Neutral Gas Galaxies, a survey of star formation in nearby galaxies selected by gas rich galaxies using H-alpha and ultraviolet observations
- SINGS – (observing program) Spitzer Infrared Nearby Galaxies Survey
- SIPS – (observing program/catalog) Southern Infrared Proper Motion Survey, a program to identify stars with high proper motions at infrared wavelengths
- SIRTF – (telescope) Space InfraRed Telescope Facility or Shuttle InfraRed Telescope Facility, older names for the Spitzer Space Telescope
- SIS – (Instrumentation) Superconductor-Isolator-Superconductor
- SKA – (telescope) Square Kilometre Array
- SL – (catalog) Shoemaker–Levy, the comets discovered by Shoemaker and Levy, particularly Shoemaker–Levy 9
- SL – (spacecraft) SpaceLab
- SLED - (astrophysics terminology) Spectral Line Energy Distribution, a description of the relative strength of CO emission lines
- SLS – (launch vehicle) American Space Shuttle-derived super heavy-lift expendable launch vehicle.
- SMA – (telescope) Submillimeter Array
- SMART – (spacecraft) Small Missions for Advanced Research in Technology
- SMARTS – (organization) Small and Moderate Aperture Research Telescope System at Cerro Tololo Inter-American Observatory
- SMBH – (celestial object) super massive black hole
- SMC – (celestial object) Small Magellanic Cloud
- SME – (spacecraft) Solar Mesosphere Explorer, a spacecraft used to study the Earth's ozone layer
- SMEX – (spacecraft) SMall EXplorers, the name of a series of small astronomical spacecraft; also the program to develop the spacecraft
- SMG - (celestial object) submillimeter galaxy
- SMM – (telescope) Solar Maximum Mission, a solar space telescope
- SN – (instrumentation) signal-to-noise, the ratio of the signal from an object to the noise from the detector that measured the signal
  - also SNR – Signal-to-nosie ratio
- SN – (celestial object) supernova
  - also SNe (plural form of SN)
- SNAP – (telescope) SuperNova Acceleration Probe, proposed space telescope
- SNR – (celestial object) supernova remnant
- SNU – (astrophysics terminology) solar neutrino units
- SOARD – (software) Steward Observatory Asteroid Relational Database
- SOFIA – (telescope) Stratospheric Observatory for Infrared Astronomy, an infrared telescope currently under construction that will fly inside a modified Boeing 747 aircraft
- SOHO – (telescope) SOlar and Heliospheric Observatory, a solar space telescope
- SONEAR – Southern Observatory for Near Earth Asteroids Research
- SOLO – Solar Orbiter
- SPARTAN – (telescope) Shuttle Pointed Autonomous Research Tool for AstroNomy, an ultraviolet space telescope that can be released and retrieved by the Space Shuttle
- SPHERE – (instrumentation) Spectro-Polarimetric High-Contrast Exoplanet Research, VLT
- SPIRE - (instrumentation) Spectral and Photometric Imaging Receiver, a Herschel imaging camera and low-resolution spectrometer
- SPIRIT – (instrument) SPace InfraRed Imaging Telescope, an infrared instrument on the Midcourse Space Experiment spacecraft
- SPS – (spacecraft) solar power satellite, a general name for proposed satellites that would convert solar power into energy and then beam the energy to the surface of a planet (such as Earth) in the form of microwaves
- SPS – (astrophysical terminology) stellar population synthesis
- SPT – (telescope) South Pole Telescope
- SQIID – (instrumentation) Simultaneous Quad Infrared Imaging Device
- SQM – (celestial object) strange quark matter
- SR – (astrophysics terminology) Special Relativity
- SRON – (organization) Space Research Organization of the Netherlands
- SS – (celestial object) Symbiotic Star, a type of binary star system containing a red giant and a hot dwarf star that generate a cone-shaped nebula
- sSFR – (astrophyics terminology) specific star formation rate
- SSI – (instrumentation) Solid-State Imager, an instrument on the Galileo spacecraft
- SSI – (organization) Space Studies Institute
- SSP – (instrumentation) Surface Science Package, on board the Huygens probe
- SSP – (astrophysics terminology) simple stellar population
- SSRQ – (celestial object) Steep Spectrum Radio Quasars
- SSS – (observing program) SuperCOSMOS Sky Surveys
- SSSPM – (catalog) SuperCOSMOS Sky Survey Proper Motion
- SST – (telescope) Spectroscopic Survey Telescope
- SST – (telescope) Spitzer Space Telescope, a space telescope
- STARSMOG – (observing program) STarlight Absorption Reduction through a Survey of Multiple Occulting Galaxies, a survey using Hubble Space Telescope imaging
- STEPS – (observing program) STEllar Planet Survey
- STEREO – Solar TErrestrial RElations Observatory
- STIS – (instrumentation) Space Telescope Imaging Spectrograph, an instrument on the Hubble Space Telescope
- STS – (vehicle) Shuttle Transport System or Space Transportation System
- STScI – (organization) Space Telescope Science Institute
- STSDAS – (software) Space Telescope Science Data Analysis System
- SUGRA – (astrophysics terminology) supergravity
- SUPRIME – (instrumentation) SUbaru PRIME focus CAMera, an instrument on the Subaru Telescope
- SUSI – (telescope) Sydney University Stellar Interferometer, an optical interferometer
- SWAN – (instrumentation) Solar Wind ANisotropy, an instrument on SOHO
- SWAS – (telescope) Submillimeter Wave Astronomy Satellite, a submillimeter space telescope
- SWEEPS – (observing program) – Sagittarius Window Eclipsing Extrasolar Planet Search, a survey of a subsection of the plane of the Milky Way performed with the Hubble Space Telescope
- SWIRE – (observing program) Spitzer Wide-area InfraRed Extragalactic survey
- SwRI – (organization) Southwest Research Institute
- SXARI – (celestial object) SX ARIetis, a class of rotating variable stars named after SX Arietis, the archetype for the class
- SXPHE – (celestial object) SX PhoEnicis, a class of pulsating variable stars named after SX Phoenicis, the archetype for the class

== T ==
- T-1 – (observing program) First Jupiter Trojan survey at Mount Palomar, part of the P–L survey
- T-2 – (observing program) Second Jupiter Trojan survey at Mount Palomar, part of the P–L survey
- T-3 – (observing program) Third Jupiter Trojan survey at Mount Palomar, part of the P–L survey
- TABLEAUX – International Conference on Automated Reasoning with Analytic Tableaux and Related Methods
- TAC – (organization) Time Allocation Committee or Telescope Allocation Committee, a general name for a committee that awards telescope observing time
- TAC – (catalog) Twin Astrograph Catalog
- TAI – (astrophysics terminology) International Atomic Time
- TAMS – (astrophysics terminology) terminal-age main sequence, stars at the point in their lifetimes where they have finished burning hydrogen in their cores
- TAROT – (telescope) Télescope à Action Rapide pour les Objets Transitoires
- TASS – (observing program) The Amateur Sky Survey
- TARDIS – (software) an open-source program used for numerical modelling and analysis of supernovae
- TAU – (spacecraft) Thousand Astronomical Unit, a spacecraft mission proposed in the 1980s that would reach 1000 AU in 50 years
- TCB – (astrophysics terminology) Barycentric Coordinate Time
- TCC – Theory of Cryptography Conference
- TCG – (astrophysics terminology) Geocentric Coordinate Time
- TDB – (astrophysics terminology) Barycentric Dynamical Time
- TDRSS – (communications network) Tracking and Data Relay Satellite System, an array of satellites used by NASA to communicate with many spacecraft in low Earth orbit
- TES – (instrumentation) Thermal Emission Spectrometer, a spectrometer on the Mars Observer
- TESS - (spacecraft) Transiting Exoplanet Survey Satellite, NASA: an all-sky survey mission that will discover thousands of exoplanets around nearby bright stars. TESS launched 18 April 2018 aboard a SpaceX Falcon 9 rocket
- TEP – (organization) Transits of Extrasolar Planets
- TRGB - (celestial object) - Tip of the Red-Giant Branch stars, a primary distance indicator
- TGF – (celestial object) – Terrestrial gamma-ray flash, gamma rays emitted from Earth's lightning storms
- THEMIS – (instrumentation) Thermal Emission Imaging System, a camera on the Mars Odyssey spacecraft
- TIC – (catalog) Tycho Input Catalog, a predecessor of the Hipparcos Input Catalog
- TIFR – (organization) – Tata Institute of Fundamental Research - India
- TIR – (astrophysics terminology) total infrared
- TIMED – (spacecraft) thermosphere ionosphere mesosphere energetics and dynamics
- TIE – (organization) Telescopes In Education
- TLP – (astrophysics terminology) Transient Lunar Phenomenon, an unexplained flash of light observed from the Moon
- TMC – (celestial object) Taurus Molecular Cloud
- TMT – (telescope) – Thirty Meter Telescope, formerly known as California Extremely Large Telescope
- TN – (person) telescope nut, nickname for an amateur telescope maker
- TNO – (celestial object) trans-Neptunian object, any object that orbits the Sun at a distance greater than that of Neptune
- TO – (person) telescope operator, the technician who assists in operating a telescope during astronomical observations
- TOPS – (meeting) Toward Other Planetary Systems, a series of educational astronomy workshops
- TPF – (telescope) Terrestrial Planet Finder, a planned space telescope that will be used to find extrasolar Earth-like planets
- TPHOLs – Theorem Proving in Higher-Order Logics
- TRACE – Transition Region and Coronal Explorer, a solar space telescope
- TrES – (telescope) Transatlantic Exoplanet Survey
- TT – (astrophysics terminology) Terrestrial Time
  - also TDT – terrestrial dynamical time
- TTS – (celestial object) T-Tauri star
- TWA – (celestial object) TW Hydrae Association
- TYC – (catalog) Tycho, a catalog that was the predecessor of the Hipparcos (HIP) Catalogue
- TZO – (celestial object) Thorne–Żytkow object, the object that forms when a neutron star merges with a red giant

== U ==
- UAI – Union Astronomique Internationale
- UARS – (spacecraft) Upper Atmosphere Research Satellite, a satellite used to study the Earth's upper atmosphere
- UCAC – (catalog) USNO CCD Astrometric Catalog
- UESAC – (observing program) Uppsala-ESO Survey of Asteroids and Comets
- UFO – (astrophysics terminology) unidentified flying object
- UG – (celestial object) U Geminorum, a class of cataclysmic variable stars (also known as dwarf novae) that are named after U Geminorum, the archetype for the class
  - UGSS – (celestial object) UG SS Cygni, a subclass of UG-type stars named after SS Cygni, the archetype for the subclass
  - UGSU – (celestial object) UG SU Ursae Majoris, a subclass of UG-type stars named after SU Ursae Majoris, the archetype for the subclass
  - UGWZ – (celestial object) UG WZ Sagittae, a subclass of UG-type stars named after WZ Sagittae, the archetype for the subclass
  - UGZ – (celestial object) UG Z Camelopardalis, a subclass of UG-type stars named after Z Camelopardalis, the archetype for the subclass
- UGC – (catalog) Uppsala General Catalogue, a catalog of galaxies
- UIT – (telescope) Ultraviolet Imaging Telescope, an ultraviolet telescope that was operated from the cargo bay of the Space Shuttle
- UVIT – (telescope) Ultra-Violet Imaging Telescope, an ultraviolet telescope on board the AstroSat observatory
- UKIDSS – (observing program/catalog) UKIRT Infrared Deep Sky Survey
- UKIRT – (telescope) United Kingdom Infrared Telescope
- UKSA – (organization) UK Space Agency
- UKST – (telescope) United Kingdom Schmidt Telescope
- ULIRG – (celestial object) UltraLuminous InfraRed Galaxy, a galaxy that is brighter than 10^{12} solar luminosities in the infrared
- ULX – (celestial object) ultraluminous x-ray source
- Ultramassive black hole — (celestial object) ultramassive black hole
- UMS – (celestial object) Upper Main Sequence, the more massive hydrogen-burning main-sequence stars
- USAF – (organization) United States Air Force
- USGS – (organization) United States Geological Survey
- USNO – (organization) United States Naval Observatory
- UT – (astrophysics terminology) Universal Time
- UTC – (astrophysics terminology) Coordinated Universal Time
- UV – (astrophysics terminology) ultraviolet
- UVS – (instrumentation) UltraViolet Spectrometer, the name of instruments on the Voyager and Galileo spacecraft
- UXOR – (celestial object) UX ORionis objects, a class of variable pre–main sequence stars named after UX Orionis, the archetype for the class
- UZC – Updated Zwicky Catalogue

== V ==
- VBO – (organization) Vainu Bappu Observatory, located in India
- VBT – (telescope) Vainu Bappu Telescope, located at Vainu Bappu Observatory
- VCC – (catalog) Virgo Cluster Catalog, a catalog of galaxies in the Virgo Cluster
- VdS – (organization) Vereinigung der Sternfreunde, the German amateur astronomers society
- VEEGA – (astrophysics terminology) Venus-Earth-Earth Gravity Assist, the path taken by the Galileo spacecraft to reach Jupiter
- VeLLO – (celestial object) very-low-luminosity object
- VERITAS – (telescope) Very Energetic Radiation Imaging Telescope Array System, gamma-ray telescope in Arizona sensitive to GeV/TeV gamma rays
- VERA – (telescope) VLBI Exploration of Radio Astrometry, a Japanese radio telescope designed for studying objects in the Milky Way
- VHE – (astrophysics terminology) Very High Energy, gamma rays with high energies
- VIMOS – (instrumentation) VIsible Multi-Object Spectrograph, instrument on the VLT
- VIPERS – VIMOS Public Extragalactic Redshift Survey an ESO Large Program
- VISTA – (telescope) Visible and Infrared Survey Telescope for Astronomy
- VLA – (telescope) Very Large Array, a radio telescope in New Mexico operated by the National Radio Astronomy Observatory
- VLBA – (telescope) Very Long Baseline Array, a radio telescope operated by the National Radio Astronomy Observatory with antennas spread across the United States
- VLBI – (instrumentation) very long baseline interferometry, combining signals from multiple telescopes/radio antennas that are separated by large distances
- VLM – (astrophysics terminology) very low mass, objects (usually stars) that have relatively low masses
- VLT – (telescope) Very Large Telescope, four 8.2 meter telescopes in Chile that operate either independently as individual telescopes or together as an interferometer
- VLT-SPHERE – (instrumentation) Spectro-Polarimetric High-Contrast Exoplanet Research; installed at VLT's UT3
- VMO – (software) The Virtual Meteor Observatory is an activity of the International Meteor Organization together with the Research and Scientific Support Department of the European Space Agency to store meteor data from observers all over the world.
- VO – (software) Virtual Observatory
- VOIR – (spacecraft) Venus Orbiting Imaging Radar, a spacecraft for mapping Venus that was canceled and then superseded by the Magellan spacecraft
- VRM – (spacecraft) Venus Radar Mapper, an older name for the Magellan spacecraft
- VSOLJ – (organization) Variable Star Observers League in Japan
- VSOP – (organization) VLBI Space Observatory Program, a project to use both satellites and ground-based radio telescopes as an interferometer
- VST – (telescope) VLT Survey Telescope
- VV – Vorontsov-Vel'yaminov Interacting Galaxies
- VVDS – (observing program) VIMOS-VLT Deep Survey

== W ==
- WALLABY – a survey of neutral hydrogen in galaxies
- WD – (celestial object) white dwarf
- WDM – (astrophysics terminology) warm dark matter, any model for structure formation in the universe that characterizes "hot" particles such as neutrinos as dark matter
- WDS – (catalog) Washington Double Star, a catalog of double stars
- WEBT – (organization) Whole Earth Blazar Telescope, a network of observers across the Earth who work together to perform continuous observations of blazars
- WET – (organization) Whole Earth Telescope, a network of astronomers spread across the Earth who work together to perform continuous observations of variable stars
- WFCAM – (instrumentation) Wide Field Camera, a camera on the United Kingdom Infrared Telescope
- WFIRST - (telescope) Wide-Field Infrared Survey Telescope, former name of the Nancy Grace Roman Space Telescope scheduled for launch in 2025
- WFMOS – (instrumentation) Wide-Field Multi-Object Spectrograph, proposed instrument for the Gemini telescopes
- WFPC – (instrumentation) Wide Field and Planetary Camera, a camera formerly on the Hubble Space Telescope that was replaced with WFPC2
- WFPC2 – (instrumentation) Wide Field and Planetary Camera 2, a camera on the Hubble Space Telescope
- WFC – (instrumentation) Wide-Field Channel, one of the detectors in the Advanced Camera for Surveys on the Hubble Space Telescope
- WGPSN – (organization) Working Group for Planetary System Nomenclature
- WHT – (telescope) William Herschel Telescope
- WIMP – (celestial object) Weakly Interacting Massive Particle, a hypothetical subatomic particle that may comprise most of the dark matter in the universe
- WIRCam – (instrumentation) Wide-field InfraRed Camera, instrument on the Canada-France-Hawaii Telescope
- WIRE – Wide Field Infrared Explorer
- WISARD – (software) Web Interface for Searching Archival Research Data
- WISE – (observing program) Wide-field Infrared Survey Explorer
- WIYN – (telescope) Wisconsin-Indiana-Yale-NOAO, the name of a telescope at Kitt Peak operated by the University of Wisconsin–Madison, Indiana University, Yale University, and the National Optical Astronomy Observatory
- WLM – (celestial object) Wolf-Lundmark-Melotte, a nearby dwarf galaxy in the constellation Cetus
- WMAP – (telescope) Wilkinson Microwave Anisotrophy Probe, a space telescope used to study the cosmic microwave background radiation
- WR – (celestial object) Wolf–Rayet, a type of hot, luminous star with strong stellar winds
  - WC – (celestial object) carbon-rich Wolf–Rayet, a Wolf–Rayet star with strong carbon spectral line emission
  - WN – (celestial object) nitrogen-rich Wolf–Rayet, a Wolf–Rayet star with strong nitrogen spectral line emission
    - WNE – (celestial object) early-type nitrogen-rich wolf–rayet, a wn star without hydrogen spectral line emission
    - WNL – (celestial object) late-type nitrogen-rich Wolf–Rayet, a WN star with hydrogen spectral line emission
  - WO – (celestial object) oxygen-rich Wolf–Rayet, a Wolf–Rayet star with strong oxygen spectral line emission
- WSRT – (telescope) an aperture synthesis interferometer that consists of a linear array of 14 antennas
- WTTS – (celestial object) weak-line t-tauri star, a type of young star with weak spectral line emission

== X ==
- XCS – (observing program) XMM Cluster Survey
- XIS – (instrumentation) X-ray imaging spectrometer, an instrument on the Suzaku space telescope
- XMM – (telescope) X-ray Multi-Mirror, the XMM-Newton earth-orbiting X-ray-sensitive telescope
- XN – (celestial object) x-ray nova
- XRF – (celestial object) x-ray flash
- XRISM - X-Ray Imaging and Spectroscopy Mission, an X-ray space telescope (pronounced 'crism' or 'krizz-em', as if the X was a chi).

== Y ==
- Ys – (celestial object) yellow straggler
- YSG – (celestial object) yellow super giant star
- YSO – (celestial object) young stellar object

== Z ==
- ZAHB – (celestial object) "zero-age" horizontal branch, horizontal branch stars that have just begun burning helium in their cores and hydrogen in a shell around the cores
- ZAMS – (celestial object) zero age main sequence, a star that has just become a main-sequence star (i.e. a star that has begun burning hydrogen in its core)
- ZAND – (celestial object) Z ANDromedae, a class of eruptive variable stars named after the binary star system Z Andromedae, the archetype for the class
  - ZANDE – (celestial object) Z ANDromedae with eclipses, a subclass of ZAND stars where the stars eclipse each other
- ZEPLIN – (instrumentation) ZonEd proportional scintillation in liquid noble gases, a dark matter detector
- ZHR – (astrophysics terminology) zenith hourly rate, the maximum number of meteors per hour that may be observed during a meteor shower
- Z-FOURGE – (survey) The FourStar Galaxy Evolution Survey
- ZOA – Zone of Avoidance

== See also ==
- List of common astronomy symbols
- List of astronomical catalogues
- Glossary of astronomy
- Modern constellations
