= X-Jet =

X-Jet or XJet may refer to:

- Williams X-Jet, a single-person lightweight aircraft
- X-Jet (airline), a defunct Austrian airline
- X-Jet (comics), or Blackbird, a fictional aircraft in Marvel Comics
- XJet, a fixed-base operator at London Stansted Airport
- xjet, a YouTube channel by Bruce Simpson

== See also ==
- ExpressJet, an American airline
- Cross-Jet, a Rabasa Cycles model
- JET-X, Joint European Telescope for X-ray astronomy
