= Gliese =

Gliese may refer to:

- Rochus Gliese (1891—1978), a German actor, director, production designer, and art director
- Wilhelm Gliese (1915–1993), a German astronomer, best known for the Gliese Catalogue of Nearby Stars
- Gliese Catalogue of Nearby Stars, a modern star catalog of stars located within 25 parsecs of the Earth
  - Any of the stars in this catalog; see Category:Gliese and GJ objects
