= Rabasa =

- José Emilio Rabasa Estebanell (1856—1930), Mexican writer, diplomat and liberal politician
- Emilio Óscar Rabasa Mishkin (1925–2008), Mexican politician and diplomat
- George Rabasa (born 1941), American writer
- Rabasa Cycles, a bicycles company which was founded in 1922
- A ward in the city of Alicante, Spain
- An alternate name for the Rabisu, evil vampiric demons in Akkadian mythology
