= 1823 Gliese =

Stony main-belt asteroid

Discovery
- Discovered by: K. Reinmuth
- Discovery site: Heidelberg Obs.
- Discovery date: 4 September 1951

Designations
- Named after: Wilhelm Gliese (German astronomer)
- Alternative designations: 1951 RD · 1944 MC; 1948 VH · 1950 BL; 1950 DR · 1950 EF; 1954 NE · 1970 EU_{2} 1971 SE_{1}
- Minor planet category: main-belt · Flora

Orbital characteristics
- Epoch 4 September 2017 (JD 2458000.5)
- Uncertainty parameter 0
- Observation arc: 68.36 yr (24,967 days)
- Aphelion: 2.5268 AU
- Perihelion: 1.9244 AU
- Semi-major axis: 2.2256 AU
- Eccentricity: 0.1353
- Orbital period (sidereal): 3.32 yr (1,213 days)
- Mean anomaly: 37.708°
- Mean motion: 0° 17^{m} 48.48^{s} / day
- Inclination: 2.8919°
- Longitude of ascending node: 310.01°
- Argument of perihelion: 296.68°

Physical characteristics
- Dimensions: 8.19 km (calculated); 8.439±0.324; 9.544±0.025 km
- Synodic rotation period: 4.4864±0.0006 h (Note: Pravec, P.; Wolf, M.; Sarounova, L. (2014) web publication. Summary figures listed at the Light Curve Data Base – (1823) Gliese); 4.488±0.003 h
- Geometric albedo: 0.1349±0.0152; 0.189±0.046; 0.24 (assumed)
- Spectral type: S
- Absolute magnitude (H): 12.55±0.49 · 12.6 · 12.9

1823 Gliese, provisional designation 1951 RD, is a stony Flora asteroid from the inner regions of the asteroid belt, approximately 8 kilometers in diameter. It was discovered on 4 September 1951, by German astronomer Karl Reinmuth at Heidelberg Observatory in southern Germany. The asteroid was named after German astronomer Wilhelm Gliese.

== Orbit and classification ==
The S-type asteroid is a member of the Flora family, one of the largest groups of stony asteroids in the main-belt. It orbits the Sun in the inner main-belt at a distance of 1.9–2.5 AU once every 3 years and 4 months (1,213 days). Its orbit has an eccentricity of 0.14 and an inclination of 3° with respect to the ecliptic. The first unused observations date back to 1944 at Johannesburg Observatory, when it was identified as 1944 MC. The first used precovery was taken at the discovering Heidelberg observatory in 1950, extending the asteroid's observation arc by one year prior to its official discovery.

== Physical characteristics ==
=== Rotation period ===
A rotational lightcurve of this asteroid was obtained from photometric observations made by Czech astronomer Petr Pravec at the Ondřejov Observatory in August 2014. The lightcurve gave a well-defined rotation period of 4.4864±0.0006 hours with a brightness variation of 0.27 in magnitude (U=3). One month later, in September 2014, a second lightcurve by American astronomer Brian Warner at his Palmer Divide Observatory, Colorado, gave a concurring period of 4.488±0.003 hours with an amplitude of 0.23 in magnitude (U=3).

=== Diameter and albedo ===
According to the survey carried out by the NEOWISE mission of NASA's space-based Wide-field Infrared Survey Explorer, the asteroid measures 8.4 and 9.5 kilometers in diameter and its surface has an albedo of 0.189 and 0.135, respectively, while the Collaborative Asteroid Lightcurve Link assumes an albedo of 0.24 – derived from 8 Flora, the largest member and namesake of this asteroid's orbital family – and calculates a diameter of 8.2 kilometers with an absolute magnitude of 12.6.

== Naming ==
This minor planet was named after German astronomer Wilhelm Gliese (1915–1993) at the Astronomisches Rechen-Institut. Gliese is widely known for having compiled about 1,000 stars located within 25 parsecs of Earth into the Gliese Catalogue of Nearby Stars. The official naming citation was published by the Minor Planet Center on 18 April 1977 (M.P.C. 4156). A large number of Exoplanets derive their names form this star catalogue.
