= Freeman law =

Astronomical statement

The Freeman law is a statement in astronomy which says that disk galaxies have the same surface brightness, Σ at the center. It was described in 1970 by Ken Freeman.

More recently it has been argued that the Freeman law is an effect of selection bias. However, after accounting for selection effects, the Freeman law was confirmed in the year 2010 for a sample of 30000 Sloan Digital Sky Survey galaxy images. It can be used with the Tully–Fisher relation to determine the luminosity and therefore distance of an observed galaxy.

The Freeman law is sometimes called the Fish-Freeman effect.

== Fish law ==
The Fish law (or Fish's law) in astronomy is the analogue for the Freeman law with disk galaxies replaced by elliptical galaxies. It was described in 1964 by Robert A. Fish based on photometric results for 29 elliptical galaxies.

== Modified Newtonian Dynamics (MOND) ==
According to Brada and Milgrom,

The acceleration constant of the modified dynamics (MOND), a_{0}, appears in various predicted regularities pertinent to galaxies. For example, it features as an upper cutoff to the mean surface density (or mean surface brightness translated with M/L) of galaxies, as observed and formulated in the Freeman law for disks, and of the Fish law for ellipticals.
