= Year of the Quiet Sun (disambiguation) =

Year Of The Quiet Sun may refer to:

In film:

- A Year of the Quiet Sun, a 1984 Polish film written and directed by Krzysztof Zanussi

In literature:

- The Year of the Quiet Sun, a 1970 science fiction novel by Wilson Tucker
- The Year of the Quiet Sun: One Year at Scott Base, Antarctica: A Personal Impression, a 1968 nonfiction account by Adrian Hayter

In Science:

- International Quiet Sun Year (IQSY), the name given to a series of coordinated Sun-related observational programs performed in 1964 and 1965
