= Ken Freeman (astronomer) =

Australian astronomer and astrophysicist

Ken Freeman AC FAA FRS
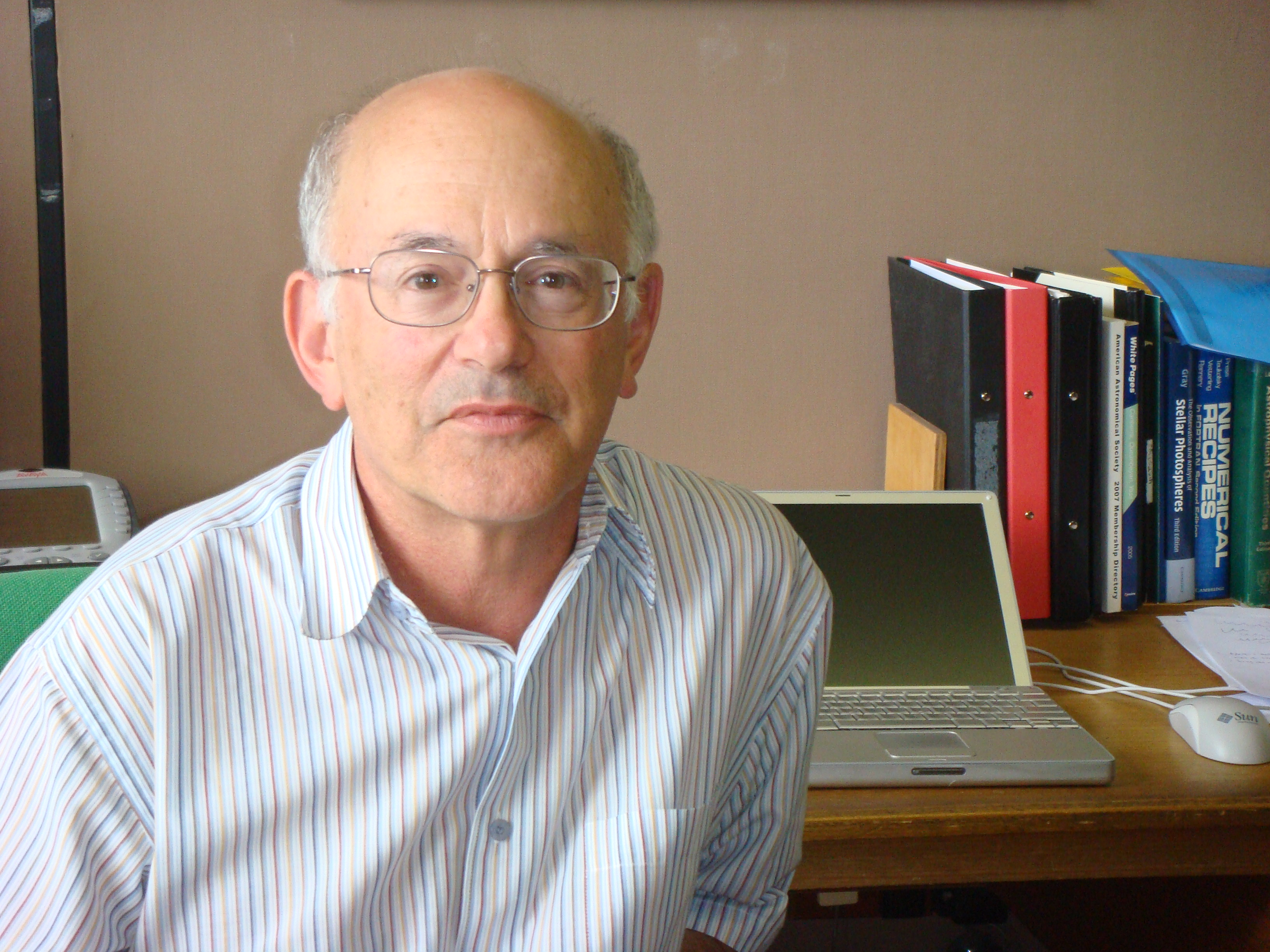
- Freeman in 2008
- Born: Kenneth Charles Freeman; 27 August 1940 (age 86); Perth, Western Australia
- Education: University of Western Australia; University of Cambridge
- Known for: Freeman Law
- Awards: Dannie Heineman Prize for Astrophysics (1999); Centenary Medal (2003); FAA; FRS; US National Academy of Sciences, Foreign Associate
- Scientific career
- Fields: Astronomy and astrophysics
- Workplaces: Australian National University
- Doctoral advisor: Leon Mestel; Donald Lynden-Bell
- Website: researchers.anu.edu.au/researchers/freeman-kc

Kenneth Charles Freeman AC FAA FRS (born 27 August 1940) is an Australian astronomer and astrophysicist who is currently Duffield Professor of Astronomy in the Research School of Astronomy and Astrophysics at the Mount Stromlo Observatory of the Australian National University in Canberra. He was born in Perth, Western Australia in 1940, studied mathematics and physics at the University of Western Australia, and graduated with first class honours in applied mathematics in 1962. He then went to Cambridge University for postgraduate work in theoretical astrophysics with Leon Mestel and Donald Lynden-Bell, and completed his doctorate in 1965. Following a postdoctoral appointment at the University of Texas with Gérard de Vaucouleurs, and a research fellowship at Trinity College, Cambridge, he returned to Australia in 1967 as a Queen Elizabeth Fellow at Mount Stromlo. Apart from a year in the Kapteyn Institute in Groningen in 1976 and some occasional absences overseas, he has been at Mount Stromlo ever since.

His research interests are in the formation and dynamics of galaxies and globular clusters, and he is particularly interested in the problem of dark matter in galaxies: he was one of the first to point out that spiral galaxies contain a large fraction of dark matter. He regularly visits the Space Telescope Science Institute as distinguished visiting scientist.

He is very active in supporting graduate students and has acted as primary supervisor for 13 postdocs and 62 PhD students, most recently Stephanie Monty on globular cluster populations in the Milky Way. Five of his students have won Hubble Fellowships. He is active in international astronomy, as a division past-president of the International Astronomical Union, and serves on visiting committees for several major astronomical institutions around the world. He has been an invited speaker at 167 international conferences since 1969. He has co-authored a book on dark matter.

== Appointments and honours ==
- 1972 Pawsey Medal of the Australian Academy of Science
- 1981 Fellow of the Australian Academy of Science
- 1990 Aaronson Lecturer at the University of Arizona
- 1993 Distinguished Achievement Award, University of California Institutes
- 1994 Oort Professor at Leiden University
- 1997 Visiting fellow at Merton College, Oxford
- 1998 Elected a Fellow of the Royal Society of London
- 1999 Dannie Heineman Prize for Astrophysics of the American Institute of Physics and the American Astronomical Society
- 2001 Tinsley Professor at the University of Texas
- 2001 Bishop Lecturer at Columbia University
- 2001 Named by ISI as one of Australia's 35 most highly cited scientists (ranked number 5)
- 2001 Gave the Robert Ellery Lecture for the Astronomical Society of Australia
- 2002 Associate of the Royal Astronomical Society in 2002
- 2003 Blaauw professor at the University of Groningen
- 2003 Centenary Medal from the Australian Government
- 2004 Antoinette de Vaucouleurs Lecture and Medal at the University of Texas
- 2008 Johann Wempe Award, Astrophysical Institute Potsdam
- 2012 Prime Minister's Prize for Science
- 2013 Matthew Flinders Medal and Lecture (Australian Academy of Science)
- 2013 Henry Norris Russell Lectureship (American Astronomical Society)
- 2014 Gruber Prize in Cosmology (jointly with Jaan Einasto, Brent Tully and Sidney van den Bergh) from the Gruber Foundation
- 2014 Peter Baume Award of The Australian National University
- 2016 Dirac Medal, University of New South Wales
- 2017 United States National Academy of Sciences, International Member
- 2017 Companion of the Order of Australia
- 2019 Sackler Lecture at Harvard University
- 2020 Elected a Legacy Fellow of the American Astronomical Society
