= Magellanic Catalogue of Stars =

Catalogue of positions for 243,561 stars

The Magellanic Catalogue of Stars is a catalogue of positions for 243,561 stars covering large areas around the Large and Small Magellanic Cloud (LMC and SMC). The catalogue was compiled by H.-J. Tucholke, K.S. de Boer and W.C. Seitter, who measured the positions on ESO Schmidt plates taken in 1988/91 and refer to the FK5 system via the PPM Star Catalogue. Stars to a photographic magnitude of 15 have been included, but the catalogue is incomplete as only those stars which are undisturbed by close neighbours have been catalogued. The positional accuracy is claimed to be better than 0.5" for 99% of the stars.
