= Hartmut Jahreiß =

German astronomer (born 1942)

- Born: 1942 (age 83–84)
- Education: University of Heidelberg
- Known for: Gliese Catalogue of Nearby Stars
- Scientific career
- Fields: astronomy
- Workplaces: Astronomisches Rechen-Institut

Hartmut Jahreiß (born 1942) is a German astronomer associated with Astronomisches Rechen-Institut specializing in the study of nearby stars.

== Work ==
Hartmut Jahreiß obtained his PhD from the University of Heidelberg. His thesis was on the spatial distribution, kinetics and age of stars near the Sun. Jahreiß soon began work at Astronomisches Rechen-Institut with Wilhelm Gliese, a world-renowned authority on nearby stars. Jahreiß is best known for his collaboration with Gliese on the publication of new editions of the Gliese Catalogue of Nearby Stars in 1979 and 1991. Upon the death of Gliese in 1993, Jahreiß wrote Gliese's obituary. The Gliese catalog stars are now known by the abbreviation GJ (Gliese–Jahreiß) in recognition of Jahreiß's contribution.

Jahreiß contributed to the Hipparcos catalogs of nearby stars. In 1997, as a member of the Research Consortium on Nearby Stars (RECONS), he identified GJ 1061, at a distance of just 3.68 parsecs, as the 20th closest star to Earth.

The main-belt asteroid, 9861 Jahreiss (1991 RB3), is named in his honor.
