= North polar sequence =

Star sequence defining magnitudes and colors

The North polar sequence is a group of 96 stars that was used to define stellar magnitudes and colors. The cluster of stars lies within two degrees of the Northern Celestial pole. That fact makes them visible to everyone in the northern hemisphere.

Originally proposed by Edward Charles Pickering, the system was used between 1900 and 1950. Today it has been replaced by the UBV photometric system.

== See also ==
- Photometric system
- Stellar classification
