= List of common astronomy symbols =

This is a compilation of symbols commonly used in astronomy, particularly professional astronomy.

== Age (stellar) ==
- τ - age

== Astrometry parameters ==
Astrometry parameters

- R_{v} - radial velocity
- cz - apparent radial velocity
- z - Redshift
- μ - proper motion
- π - parallax
- J - epoch
- α - Right Ascension
- δ - Declination
- λ - Ecliptic longitude
- β - Ecliptic latitude
- l - Galactic longitude
- b - Galactic latitude
- Δ - Distance from Earth
- ø - Geographical or astronomical latitude

== Cosmological parameters ==
Cosmological parameters

- h - dimensionless Hubble parameter
- H_{0} - Hubble constant
- Λ - cosmological constant
- Ω - density parameter
- ρ - density
- ρ_{c} - critical density
- z - redshift

== Distance description ==
Distance description for orbital and non-orbital parameters:

- d - distance
  - d - in km = kilometer
  - d - in mi = mile
  - d - in AU = astronomical unit
  - d - in ly = light-year
  - d - in pc = parsec
  - d - in kpc = kiloparsec (1000 pc)
- D_{L} - luminosity distance, obtaining an objects distance using only visual aspects

== Galaxy comparison ==
Galaxy type and spectral comparison:

- see galaxy morphological classification

== Luminosity comparison ==
Luminosity comparison:

- L_{S}, L_{☉} - luminosity of the Sun

Luminosity of certain object:

- L_{acc} - accretion luminosity
- L_{bol} - bolometric luminosity

== Mass comparison ==
Mass comparison:

- M_{E}, M_{🜨} - mass of Earth
- M_{J}, M_{♃} - mass of Jupiter
- M_{S}, M_{☉} - mass of the Sun

Mass of certain object:

- M_{●} - mass of black hole
- M_{acc} - mass of accretion disc

== Metallicity comparison ==
Metallicity comparison:

- [Fe/H] - Ratio of Iron to Hydrogen. This is not an exact ratio, but rather a logarithmic representation of the ratio of a star's iron abundance compared to that of the Sun.
  - for a given star (﹡) : $[\ce{Fe/H}] = \log[\ce{Fe/H}]_* - \log[\ce{Fe/H}]_\odot$, where the values represent the number densities of the given element.
- [M/H] - Metallicity ratio.
- Z - Metallicity
- Z_{☉}, Z_{S} - Metallicity of the Sun

== Orbital parameters ==
Orbital Parameters of a Cosmic Object:

- α - RA, right ascension, if the Greek letter does not appear, á letter will appear.
- δ - Dec, declination, if the Greek letter does not appear, ä letter will appear.
- P or P_{orb} or T - orbital period
- a - semi-major axis
- b - semi-minor axis
- q - periapsis, the minimum distance
- Q - apoapsis, the maximum distance
- e - eccentricity
- i - inclination
- Ω - longitude of ascending node
- ω - argument of periapsis
- R_{L} - Roche lobe
- M - Mean anomaly
- M_{o} - Mean anomaly at epoch

== Radius comparison ==
Radius comparison:

- R_{E}, R_{🜨} - Radius compared to Earth
- R_{J}, R_{♃} - Radius compared to Jupiter
- R_{S}, R_{☉} - Radius compared to The Sun

== Spectral comparison ==
Spectral comparison:

- see Stellar classification
- m_{(object)} - Apparent magnitude
- M_{(object)} - Absolute magnitude, for galaxies and stars
- H_{(object)} - Absolute magnitude, for planets and nonstellar objects

== Temperature description ==
Temperature description:

- T_{eff} - Temperature Effect, usually associated with luminous object
- T_{max} - Temperature Maximum, usually associated with non-luminous object
- T_{avg} - Temperature Average, usually associated with non-luminous object
- T_{min} - Temperature Minimum, usually associated with non-luminous object
- K - Kelvin

== See also ==
- List of astronomy acronyms
- Astronomical symbols
- Stellar classification
- Galaxy morphological classification
- List of astronomical catalogues
- Glossary of astronomy
