= International Sun-Earth Explorer =

International Sun-Earth Explorer may refer to:

- ISEE-1 (a.k.a. Explorer 56)
- ISEE-2
- ISEE-3 (later ICE)
