= Rabasa Cycles =

Spanish bicycle company

Rabasa Cycle is a Spanish bicycles company, headquartered in Mollet del Vallès (Barcelona, Catalonia). The company, which started as a bicycle repair shop in 1922, was founded by Simeó Rabasa i Singla.

== History ==
The first Rabasa bicycle shop opens to the public in 1922. Founded by Simeó Rabasa i Singla, its business activities originally consist of the sale, rental and repair of bicycles. Three years later, Rabasa enters into partnership with his brother in law, Vicens Solà, and within a few years they manage to open twenty-one bicycle sales and rental branches throughout the Vallès region in Barcelona, Spain. The company introduces sale on credit without interest and promotes bicycling classes for women.

In 1930, Rabasa and Solà separate and, one year later, Rabasa opens a new shop in the municipality of Martorelles (Barcelona). The new building allows him to manufacture fenders and specialize in the production of frames and accessories. During the Spanish Civil War, production is greatly reduced due to the difficulty of supplying the factory. Later during the war, the factory is confiscated by the Republican Government for use in the repair of military airplane engines.

After the civil war, production resumes. In 1944 Simeó Rabasa i Singla creates a corporation with his brother, Josep Rabasa i Singla, called Bicicletas Rabasa. From then on, the company adds the production of motorcycle components to the existing bicycle business.

In 1950 Bicicletas Rabasa transforms into Nacional Motor S.A. and launches the first Derbi motorcycle (acronym comes from the expression « derived from bicycle») in the Barcelona Exhibition Fair. The company is hence known as Rabasa Derbi. In 1970 the company is divided into two separate companies. Bicycle production remains under the direction of Margarita Rabasa (daughter of Simeó Rabasa i Singla) and Dante Adami, who found a new bicycle manufacturing plant in the municipality of Mollet del Vallès. The new plant occupies 26,000 square meters. They produce nearly two million bicycles until 1996, when the plant closes its doors.

In 2011, Albert Adami Rabasa resumes the business with Rabasa Cycle. The company focuses on the production of urban bicycles.

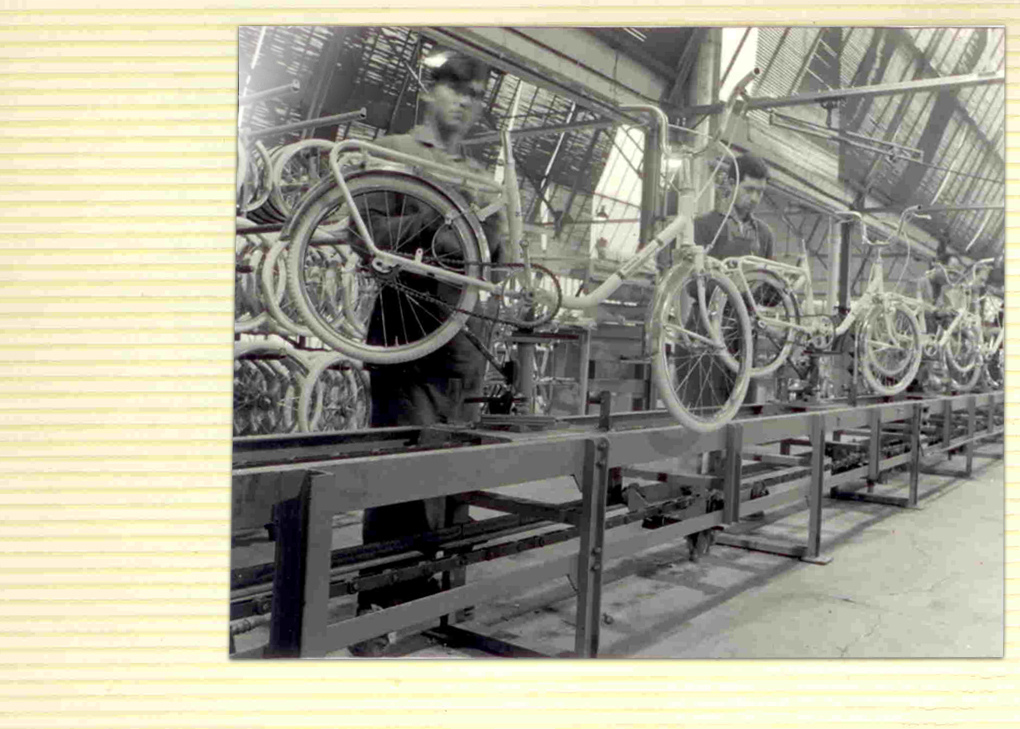
Old Rabasa Bicicletas factory in Mollet del Vallès.

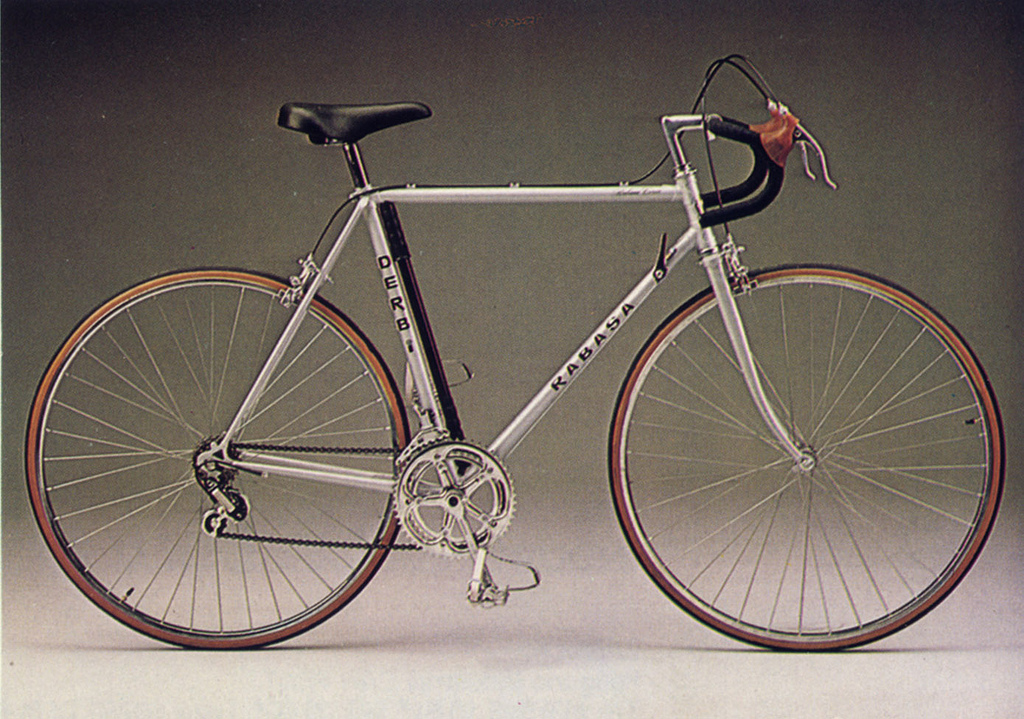
Rabasa Corsa Model.

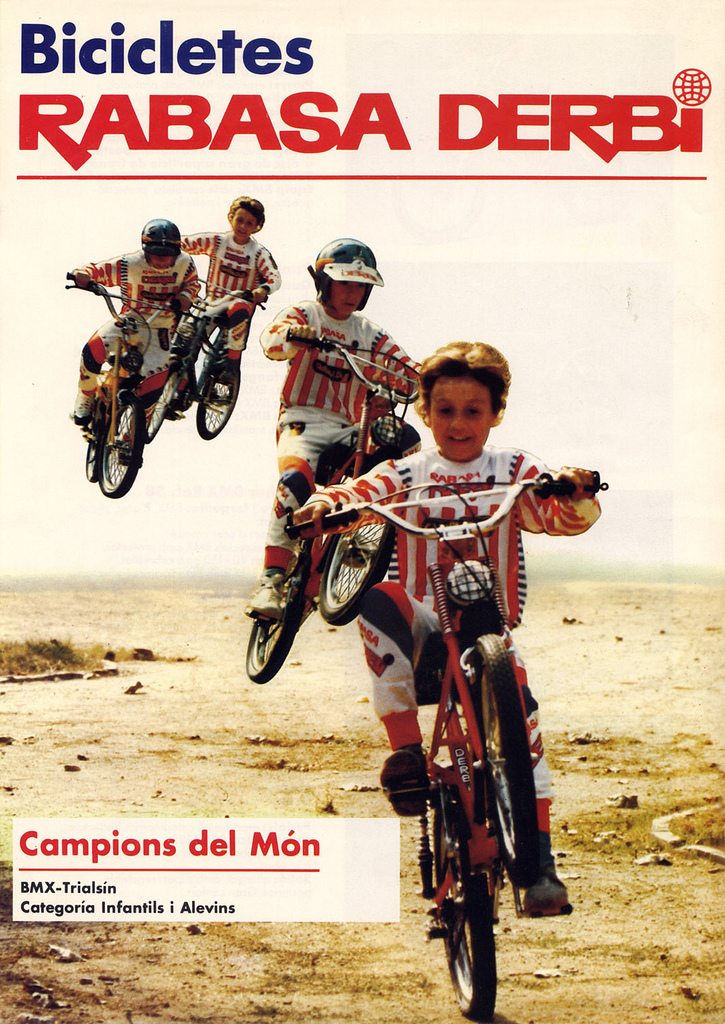
Competition Rabasa Panther bikes.

== Historic models ==
=== Panther BMX ===
The BMX bicycles in this series were sold in the 1980s. The Rabasa Derbi BMX team took home 4 world championship titles and 9 domestic championship titles, across several categories of competition. Rabasa Derbi riders competed with Panther BMX bikes.

=== Lady y Hollyday ===
In its early years as a repair and rental shop, Rabasa promoted riding classes for women. Later as a bicycle manufacturer, Rabasa designed and built various models for women and girls. Among these were the Rabasa Lady and the Rabasa Holiday.

=== Cross-Jet ===
The Panther Cross-Jet BMX was a big hit with the adolescent market in the 1980s. It was known for its disc brakes and other innovative available options. This model was used in several domestic and world BMX championships.
