= Joint European Telescope for X-ray astronomy =

Never launched European X-ray telescope

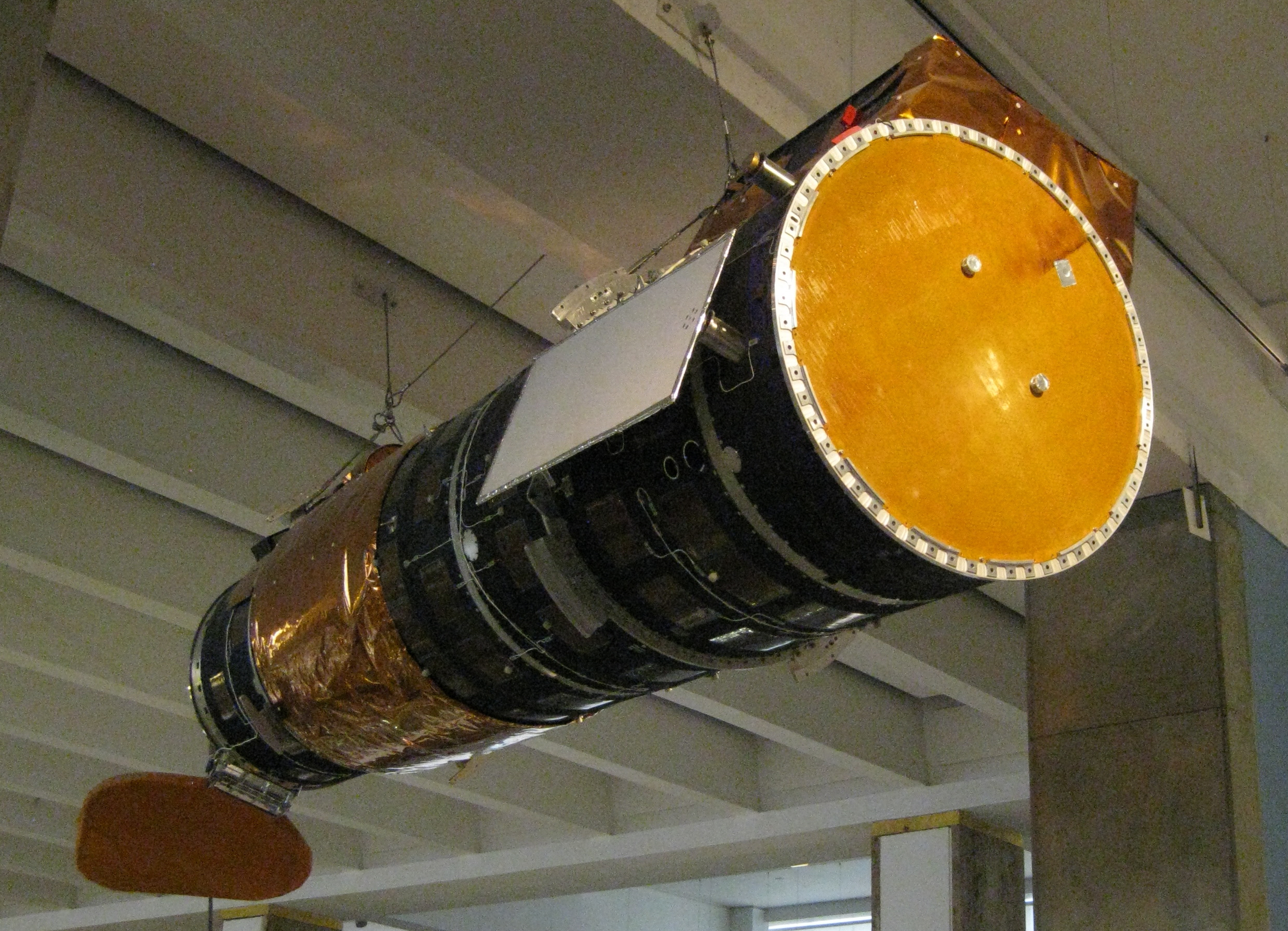
JET-X on display in the Science Museum, London

The Joint European Telescope for X-ray astronomy (JET-X) was a space telescope which was constructed as part of the Spectrum-X-Gamma project and completed in 1994 but never actually launched. It is now on display in the Science Museum, London.

It was a join cooperation of the UK, Italy, West Germany and the Soviet Union and consists of two Wolter I X-ray telescopes.

Flight spare mirrors from JET-X were used to build the X-ray Telescope which is one of the instruments on the Neil Gehrels Swift Observatory
