= Wilhelm Gliese =

German astronomer

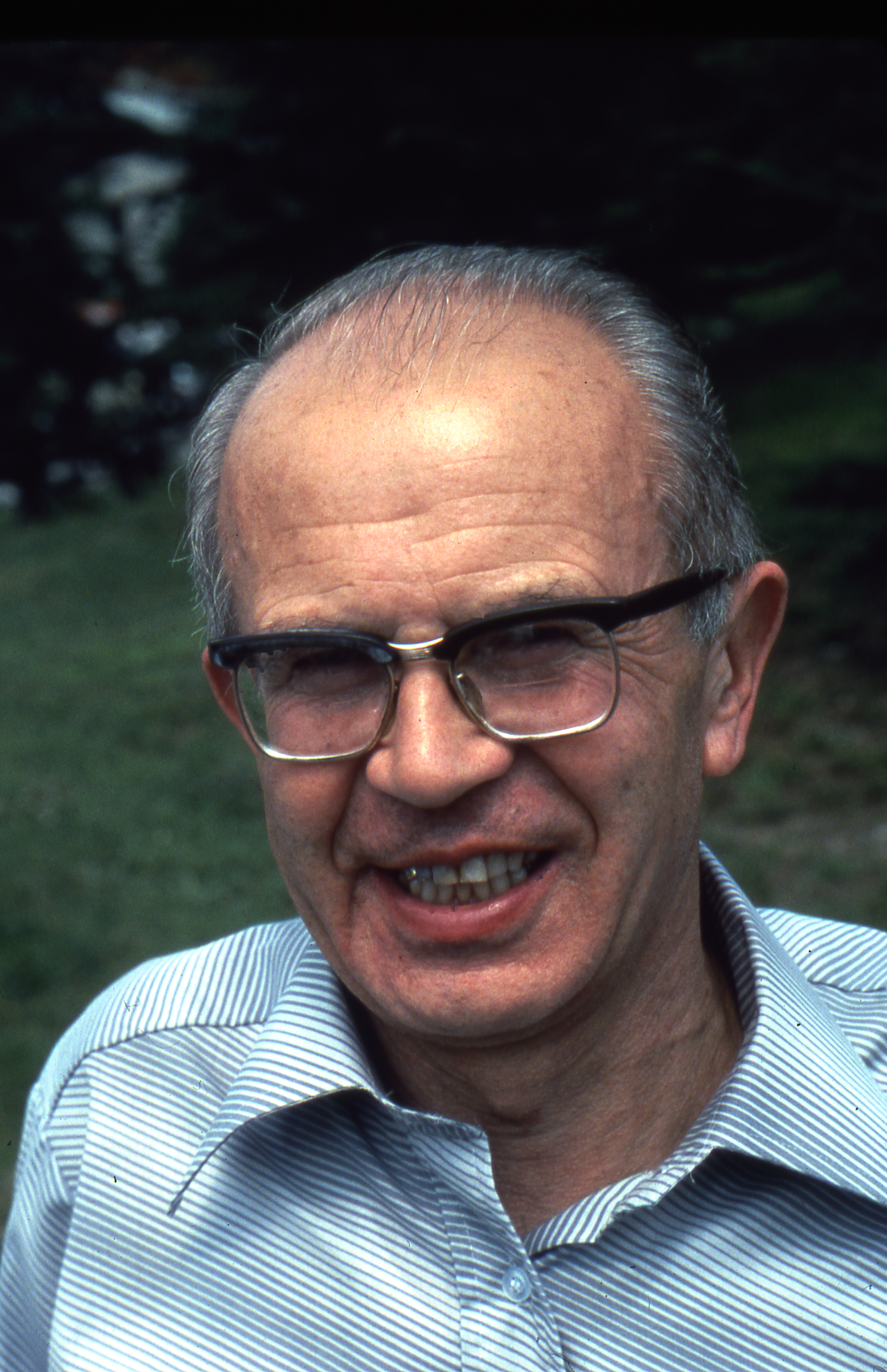
- Gliese in 1976
- Born: 21 June 1915; Goldberg, Germany, Silesia
- Died: 12 June 1993 (aged 77); Heidelberg, Germany
- Education: University of Berlin
- Known for: Gliese Catalogue of Nearby Stars
- Scientific career
- Fields: Astronomy
- Workplaces: Astronomisches Rechen-Institut
- Doctoral advisor: August Kopff

Wilhelm Gliese (German pronunciation: [ˈɡliːzə], English GLEE-zə; 21 June 1915 – 12 June 1993) was a German astronomer who specialized in the study and cataloging of nearby stars.

== Life ==
Gliese was born in Goldberg, now in Polish Silesia, the son of judge Wilhelm Gliese. He worked at the Astronomisches Rechen-Institut, first in Berlin and then in Heidelberg. While a student he was encouraged by the Dutch astronomer Peter van de Kamp to study nearby stars, which he did for the rest of his life.

His astronomical research was interrupted during World War II when he was conscripted into the German Wehrmacht in 1942 and sent to the Eastern Front. In 1945, he was taken prisoner by the Soviets and was not released until 1949. He finally resumed his research at the Institute, which had been moved by the U.S. Army to Heidelberg after the war. Although he nominally retired in 1980, he continued his research at the Institute until his death in 1993.

== Catalogs of nearby stars ==
He is best known for his Catalogue of Nearby Stars, originally published in 1957 and again in 1969. Some stars are primarily known by the catalog number he gave them, such as Gliese 581 and Gliese 710. The Gliese catalog stars are frequent targets of study due to their proximity to Earth, as suggested by their high proper motion. Gliese published two supplements to this catalog in 1979 and 1991 in collaboration with Hartmut Jahreiß. Jahreiß wrote Gliese's obituary upon his death in 1993.

== Honors ==
The asteroid 1823 Gliese, discovered by astronomer Karl Reinmuth in 1951, was named after Wilhelm Gliese.
