= Gliese Catalogue of Nearby Stars =

Star catalogue

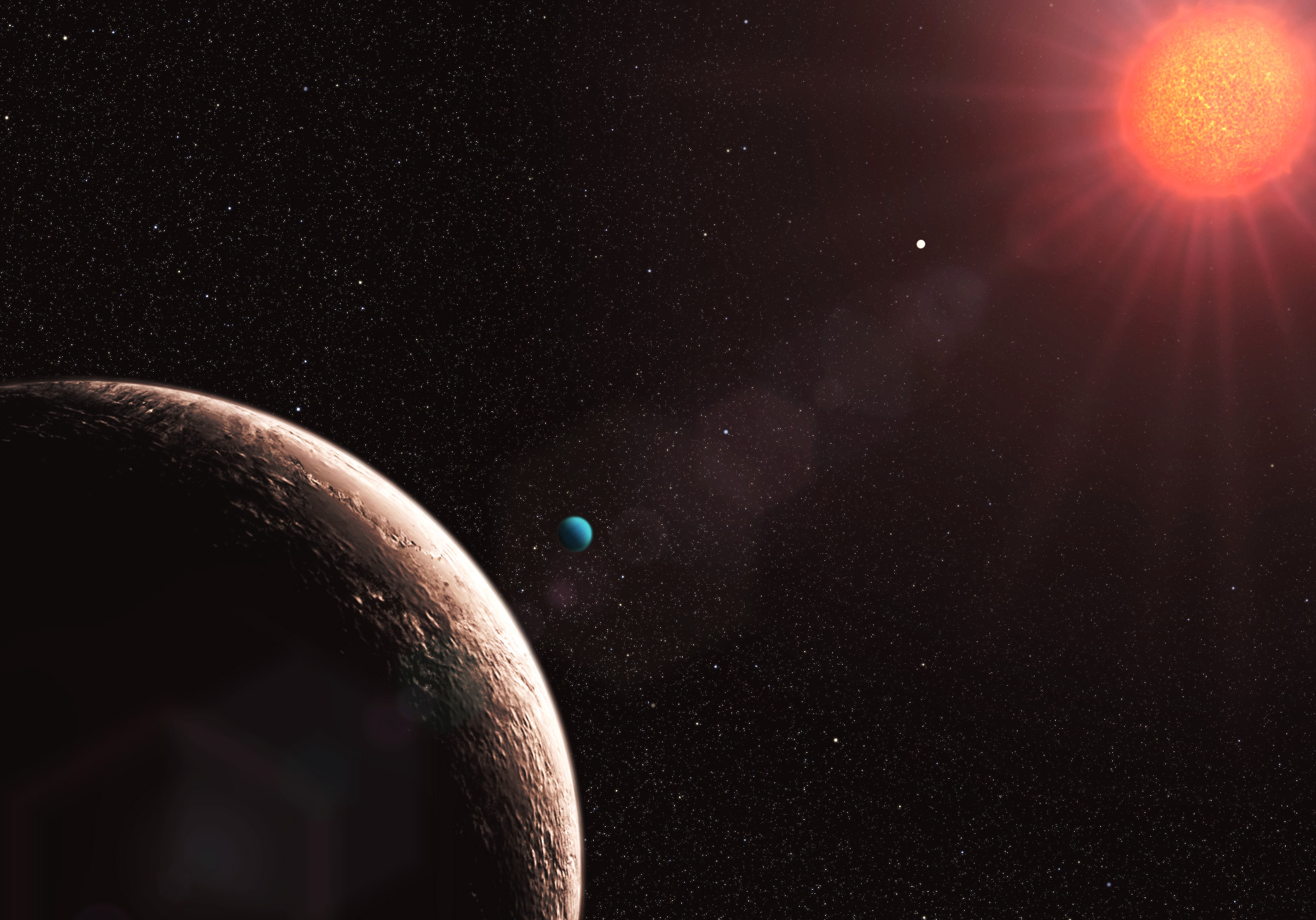
- Alternative names: Gliese–Jahreiß catalog
- Website: wwwadd.zah.uni-heidelberg.de/datenbanken/aricns/gliese.htm
- Related media on Commons

The Gliese Catalogue of Nearby Stars (German pronunciation: [ˈɡliːzə], English GLEE-zə) is a star catalogue listing stars located within 25 parsecs (82 ly) of the Sun.

== First edition and supplements ==
In 1957, German astronomer Wilhelm Gliese published his first star catalogue of 915 known stars within 20 parsecs (65 ly) of Earth, listing their known properties and ordered geographically by right ascension. Stars in the first catalogue are designated by coding GL NNN, the N representing the consecutive integer number based on this order.

Gliese published an update as the Catalogue of Nearby Stars in 1969, all known stars to 22 parsecs (72 ly), which catalogued 1,529 stars, encoded as Gl NNN.NA (prefix Gl and the entries of twelve years before gained a .0 affix; the more than 500 additional stars were recorded using interspersed 0.1, 0.2 etc. numbering). This list therefore numbered from 1.0 to 915.0 as no stars were entered after 915.0. and retained a strict right ascension order.

A Supplement published in 1970 by Richard van der Riet Woolley and associates, extended the range out to 25 parsecs (82 ly). This supplement added catalogue numbers in the range 9001–9850 using the now deprecated Wo prefix, sharing today the GJ prefix given to the later series of the catalogues.

== Succeeding editions ==
Gliese published an extension to the second edition of the catalogue in 1979 in collaboration with Hartmut Jahreiß. The combined catalogue is now commonly referred to as the Gliese–Jahreiß (GJ) catalog. This catalogue was published with two tables: Table 1 uses the designations GJ NNNN for entries numbered 1000–1294 for confirmed nearby stars; Table 2 uses the designations GJ NNNN for entries numbered 2001–2159 for suspected nearby stars. Since the publication of this catalogue all of the stars in the combined catalogue and succeeding supplements are designated by the preferred GJ prefix. Consequently, for any of the original Gliese stars, the "Gliese" designation can therefore be shortened to "GJ"; for example, either "Gliese 876" or "GJ 876" is valid, with "GJ" the more common format in research papers.

Gliese published the Third Catalogue of Nearby Stars (CNS3) in 1991, again in collaboration with Hartmut Jahreiß; the list now containing information on more than 3,800 stars. Although this catalogue was designated as preliminary, it remained the one in current use until the publication of CNS5. This catalogue lists a total of 3,803 stars. Most of these stars already had GJ numbers, but there were also 1,388 stars which were not numbered. As no final version was forthcoming, the need to give these 1,388 some name resulted in them being numbered 3001–4388 (NN numbers, for "no name"), and data files of this catalogue now usually include these numbers, although the NN prefix has since been deprecated in favor of GJ.

An online-only version of the Catalogue of Nearby Stars made by Hartmut Jahreiß in 1998 is available from the Astronomisches Rechen-Institut, Heidelberg as ARICNS.

The different versions of the catalogue reflect the change in the medium of publication from printed to electronic, the format of most other large catalogues. A nearly full update to these catalogs was published in 2010. This update provided revised J2000, epoch 2000 coordinates cross-matched with 2MASS sources where possible.

In 2022, the Fifth Catalogue of Nearby Stars (CNS5) was published, adding designations from GJ 10001 to GJ 13461.

== See also ==
- List of nearest stars
- Star catalogue: Gl, GJ, Wo
