= List of space telescopes =

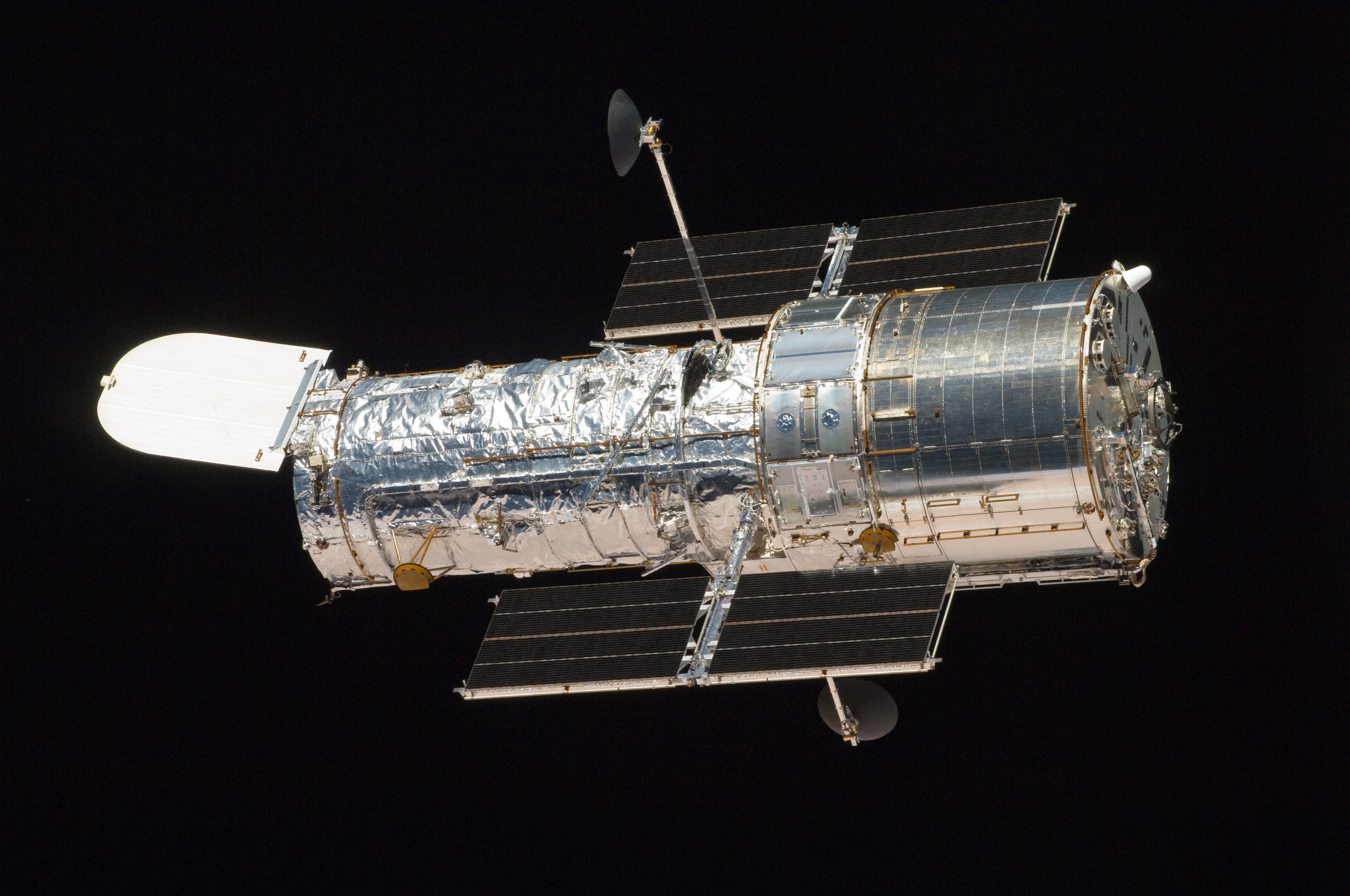
The Hubble Space Telescope

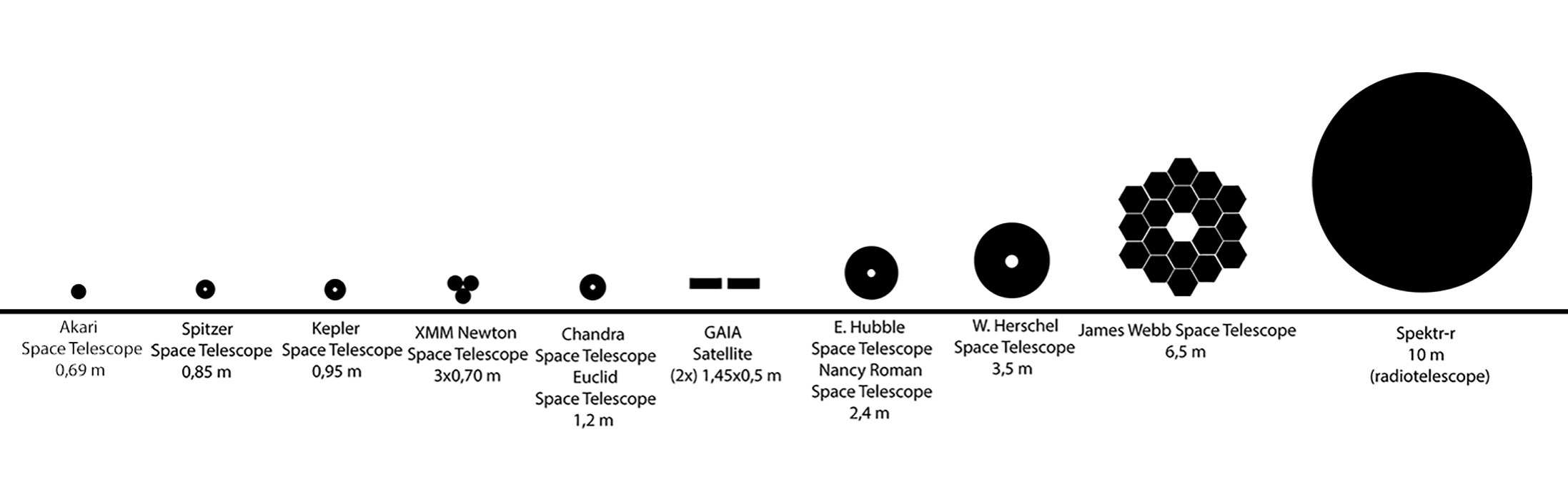
Comparison between many space telescopes by diameter

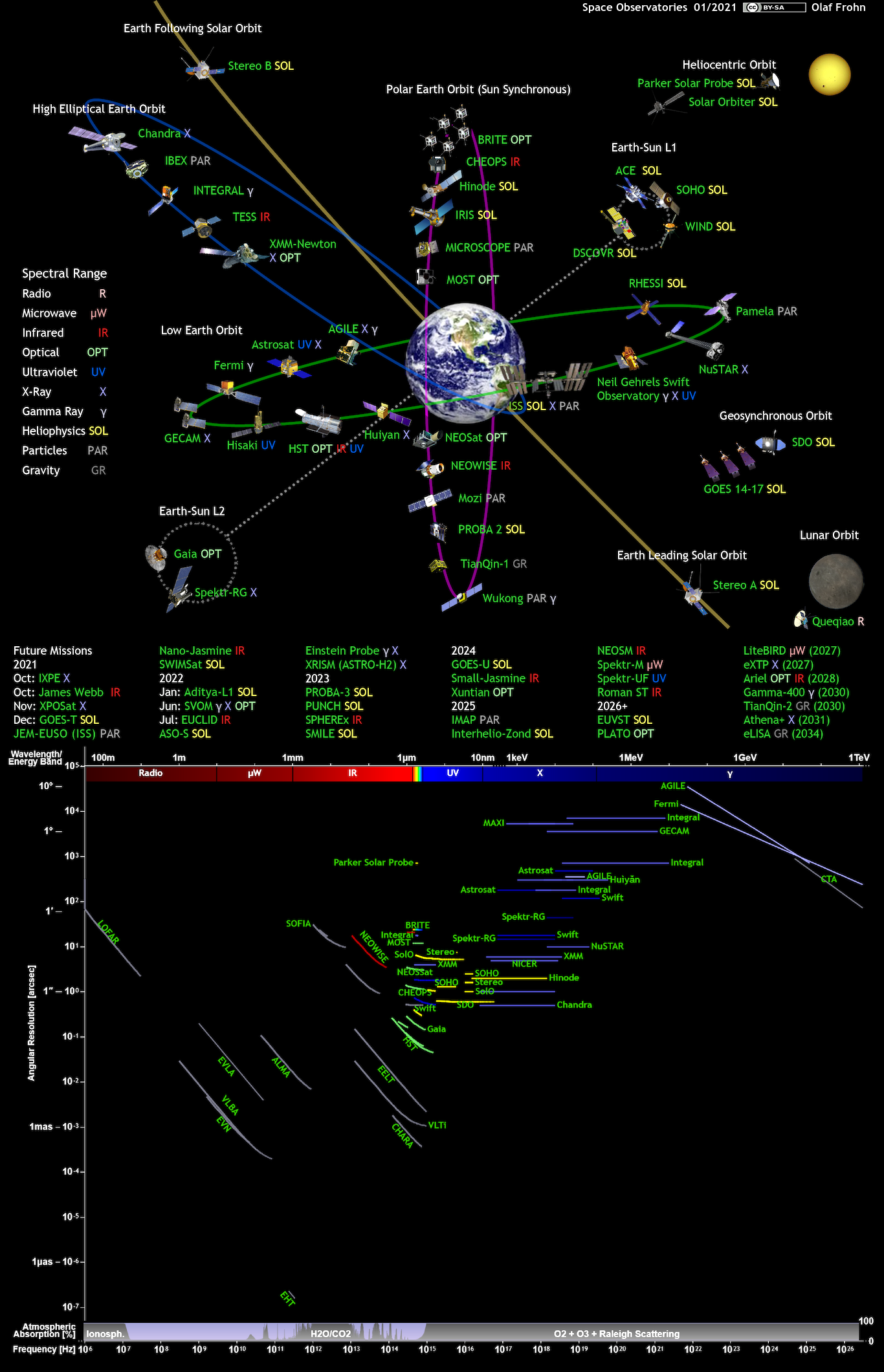
Overview of active and future telescopes (as of January 2021)

This list of space telescopes (astronomical space observatories) is grouped by major frequency ranges: gamma ray, X-ray, ultraviolet, visible, infrared, microwave and radio. Telescopes that work in multiple frequency bands are included in all of the appropriate sections. Space telescopes that collect particles, such as cosmic ray nuclei and/or electrons, as well as instruments that aim to detect gravitational waves, are also listed. Missions with specific targets within the Solar System (e.g., the Sun and its planets), are excluded; see List of Solar System probes and List of heliophysics missions for these, and List of Earth observation satellites for missions targeting Earth.

Two values are provided for the dimensions of the initial orbit. For telescopes in Earth orbit, the minimum and maximum altitude are given in kilometers. For telescopes in solar orbit, the minimum distance (periapsis) and the maximum distance (apoapsis) between the telescope and the center of mass of the Sun are given in astronomical units (AU).

== Gamma ray ==
Gamma-ray telescopes collect and measure individual, high energy gamma rays from astrophysical sources. These are absorbed by the atmosphere, requiring that observations are done by high-altitude balloons or space missions. Gamma rays can be generated by supernovae, neutron stars, pulsars and black holes. Gamma ray bursts, with extremely high energies, have also been detected but have yet to be identified.

Photo	Name	Space agency	Launch date	Terminated	Location	Ref(s)
	Proton-1	USSR	16 Jul 1965	11 Oct 1965	Earth orbit (183-589 km)	
	Proton-2	USSR	2 Nov 1965	6 Feb 1966	Earth orbit (191-637 km)	
	Proton-4	USSR	16 Nov 1968	24 Jul 1969	Earth orbit (248-477 km)	
	Small Astronomy Satellite 2 (SAS-B)	NASA	15 Nov 1972	8 Jun 1973	Earth orbit (443–632 km)	
	Cos-B	ESA	9 Aug 1975	25 Apr 1982	Earth orbit (339.6–99,876 km)	
	High Energy Astronomy Observatory 3	NASA	20 Sep 1979	29 May 1981	Earth orbit (486.4–504.9 km)	
	Granat	CNRS & IKI	1 Dec 1989	25 May 1999	Earth orbit (2,000–200,000 km)	
	Gamma	USSR, CNES, RSA	11 Jul 1990	28 Feb 1992	Earth orbit (375 km)	
	Compton Gamma Ray Observatory (CGRO)	NASA	5 Apr 1991	4 Jun 2000	Earth orbit (362–457 km)	
	Low Energy Gamma Ray Imager (LEGRI)	INTA	19 May 1997	Feb 2002	Earth orbit (600 km)	
	High Energy Transient Explorer 2 (HETE 2)	NASA	9 Oct 2000	Mar 2008	Earth orbit (590–650 km)	
	International Gamma Ray Astrophysics Laboratory (INTEGRAL)	ESA	17 Oct 2002	28 Feb 2025	Earth orbit (639–153,000 km)	
	Neil Gehrels Swift Observatory	NASA	20 Nov 2004	23 Oct 2026	Earth orbit (585–604 km)	
	Astrorivelatore Gamma ad Immagini Leggero (AGILE)	ISA	23 Apr 2007	18 Feb 2024	Earth orbit (524–553 km)	
	Fermi Gamma-ray Space Telescope	NASA	11 Jun 2008	—	Earth orbit (555 km)	
	Gamma-Ray Burst Polarimeter (IKAROS)	JAXA	21 May 2010	21 May 2015	Heliocentric orbit	
	Space Variable Objects Monitor (SVOM)	CNSA & CNES	22 Jun 2024	—	Earth orbit (625–625 km)	

== X-ray ==
X-ray telescopes measure high-energy photons called X-rays. These can not travel a long distance through the atmosphere, meaning that they can only be observed high in the atmosphere or in space. Several types of astrophysical objects emit X-rays, from galaxy clusters, through black holes in active galactic nuclei to galactic objects such as supernova remnants, stars, and binary stars containing a white dwarf (cataclysmic variable stars), neutron star or black hole (X-ray binaries). Some Solar System bodies emit X-rays, the most notable being the Moon, although most of the X-ray brightness of the Moon arises from reflected solar X-rays. A combination of many unresolved X-ray sources is thought to produce the observed X-ray background.

Photo	Name	Space agency	Launch date	Terminated	Location	Ref(s)
	Uhuru (Small Astronomy Satellite 1, SAS-A)	NASA	12 Dec 1970	Mar 1973	Earth orbit (531–572 km)	
	Astronomical Netherlands Satellite (ANS)	SRON	30 Aug 1974	Jun 1976	Earth orbit (266–1176 km)	
	Ariel V	SRC & NASA	15 Oct 1974	14 Mar 1980	Earth orbit (520 km)	
	Aryabhata	ISRO	19 Apr 1975	23 Apr 1975	Earth orbit (563–619 km)	
	Small Astronomy Satellite 3 (SAS-C)	NASA	7 May 1975	Apr 1979	Earth orbit (509–516 km)	
	Cos-B	ESA	9 Aug 1975	25 Apr 1982	Earth orbit (339.6–99,876 km)	
	Cosmic Radiation Satellite (CORSA)	ISAS	4 Feb 1976	4 Feb 1976	Failed launch	
	High Energy Astronomy Observatory 1 (HEAO 1)	NASA	12 Aug 1977	9 Jan 1979	Earth orbit (445 km)	
	Einstein Observatory (HEAO 2)	NASA	13 Nov 1978	26 Apr 1981	Earth orbit (465–476 km)	
	Hakucho (CORSA-b)	ISAS	21 Feb 1979	16 Apr 1985	Earth orbit (421–433 km)	
	High Energy Astronomy Observatory 3 (HEAO 3)	NASA	20 Sep 1979	29 May 1981	Earth orbit (486.4–504.9 km)	
	Tenma (Astro-B)	ISAS	20 Feb 1983	19 Jan 1989	Earth orbit (489–503 km)	
	Astron	IKI	23 Mar 1983	Jun 1989	Earth orbit (2,000–200,000 km)	
	EXOSAT	ESA	26 May 1983	8 Apr 1986	Earth orbit (347–191,709 km)	
	Ginga (Astro-C)	ISAS	5 Feb 1987	1 Nov 1991	Earth orbit (517–708 km)	
	Granat	CNRS & IKI	1 Dec 1989	25 May 1999	Earth orbit (2,000–200,000 km)	
	ROSAT	NASA & DLR	1 Jun 1990	12 Feb 1999	Re-entry 23 October 2011. Formerly Earth orbit (580 km)	
	Broad Band X-ray Telescope / Astro 1	NASA	2 Dec 1990	11 Dec 1990	Earth orbit (500 km)	
	Advanced Satellite for Cosmology and Astrophysics (ASCA, Astro-D)	ISAS & NASA	20 Feb 1993	2 Mar 2001	Earth orbit (523.6–615.3 km)	
	Array of Low Energy X-ray Imaging Sensors (Alexis)	LANL	25 Apr 1993	2005	Earth orbit (749–844 km)	
	Rossi X-ray Timing Explorer (RXTE)	NASA	30 Dec 1995	3 Jan 2012	Earth orbit (409 km)	
	BeppoSAX	ASI	30 Apr 1996	30 Apr 2002	Earth orbit (575–594 km)	
	A Broadband Imaging X-ray All-sky Survey (ABRIXAS)	DLR	28 Apr 1999	1 Jul 1999	Earth orbit (549–598 km)	
	Chandra X-ray Observatory	NASA	23 Jul 1999	—	Earth orbit (9,942–140,000 km)	
	XMM-Newton	ESA	10 Dec 1999	—	Earth orbit (7,365–114,000 km)	
	High Energy Transient Explorer 2 (HETE 2)	NASA	9 Oct 2000	Mar 2008	Earth orbit (590–650 km)	
	International Gamma Ray Astrophysics Laboratory (INTEGRAL)	ESA	17 Oct 2002	28 Feb 2025	Earth orbit (639–153,000 km)	
	Neil Gehrels Swift Observatory	NASA	20 Nov 2004	23 Oct 2026	Earth orbit (585–604 km)	
	Suzaku (Astro-E2)	JAXA & NASA	10 Jul 2005	2 Sep 2015	Earth orbit (550 km)	
	Astrorivelatore Gamma ad Immagini Leggero (AGILE)	ISA	23 Apr 2007	18 Jan 2024	Earth orbit (524–553 km)	
	Nuclear Spectroscopic Telescope Array (NuSTAR)	NASA	13 Jun 2012	—	Earth orbit (603.5 km)	
	AstroSat	ISRO	28 Sep 2015	—	Earth orbit (600–650 km)	
	Hitomi (Astro-H)	JAXA	17 Feb 2016	28 Apr 2016	Earth orbit (575 km)	
	Mikhailo Lomonosov	Moscow State University	28 Apr 2016	30 Jun 2018	Earth orbit (478–493 km)	
	Neutron Star Interior Composition Explorer (NICER)	NASA	7 Jun 2017	—	International Space Station	
	Hard X-ray Modulation Telescope (HXMT)	CNSA & CAS	14 Jun 2017	—	Low Earth orbit (545–554.1 km)	
	Spektr-RG	RSRI & MPE	Jul 13, 2019	—	Sun-Earth L_{2}	
	Imaging X-ray Polarimetry Explorer (IXPE)	NASA	9 Dec 2021	—	Earth orbit (540 km)	
	Lobster Eye Imager for Astronomy (LEIA)	CAS	27 Jul 2022	—	Low Earth orbit	
	X-ray Imaging and Spectroscopy Mission (XRISM)	JAXA & NASA	7 Sep 2023	—	Earth orbit (550 km)	
	X-ray Polarimeter Satellite (XPoSat)	ISRO & RRI	1 Jan 2024	—	Earth orbit (638–653 km)	
	Einstein Probe	CAS & ESA & MPE	9 Jan 2024	—	Earth orbit (581–593 km)	
	Space Variable Objects Monitor (SVOM)	CNSA & CNES	22 Jun 2024	—	Earth orbit (625–625 km)	
	BlackCAT	NASA	11 Jan 2026	—	Geocentric orbit	

== Ultraviolet ==
Ultraviolet telescopes make observations at ultraviolet wavelengths, i.e. between approximately 10 and 320 nm. Light at these wavelengths is absorbed by the Earth's atmosphere, so observations at these wavelengths must be performed from the upper atmosphere or from space. Objects emitting ultraviolet radiation include the Sun, other stars and galaxies.

Photo	Name	Space agency	Launch date	Terminated	Observing location	Ref(s)
	OAO-2 (Stargazer)	NASA	7 Dec 1968	Jan 1973	Earth orbit (749–758 km)	
	Orion 1 and Orion 2 Space Observatories	USSR	19 Apr 1971 (Orion 1); (Orion 2) 18 Dec 1973	1971; 1973	Earth orbit (Orion 1: 200–222 km; Orion 2: 188–247 km)	
	Far Ultraviolet Camera/Spectrograph (UVC)	NASA	16 Apr 1972	23 Apr 1972	Descartes Highlands on lunar surface	
	OAO-3 Copernicus	NASA	21 Aug 1972	Feb 1981	Earth orbit (713–724 km)	
	Astronomical Netherlands Satellite (ANS)	SRON	30 Aug 1974	Jun 1976	Earth orbit (266–1176 km)	
	International Ultraviolet Explorer (IUE)	ESA & NASA & SERC	26 Jan 1978	30 Sep 1996	Earth orbit (32,050–52,254 km)	
	Astron	IKI	23 Mar 1983	Jun 1989	Earth orbit (2,000–200,000 km)	
	Hubble Space Telescope	NASA & ESA	24 Apr 1990	—	Earth orbit (586–610 km)	
	Broad Band X-ray Telescope / Astro 1	NASA	2 Dec 1990	11 Dec 1990	Earth orbit (500 km)	
	Extreme Ultraviolet Explorer (EUVE)	NASA	7 Jun 1992	31 Jan 2001	Earth orbit (515–527 km)	
	Astro 2	NASA	2 Mar 1995	18 Mar 1995	Earth orbit (349–363 km)	
	Far Ultraviolet Spectroscopic Explorer (FUSE)	NASA & CNES & CSA	24 Jun 1999	12 Jul 2007	Earth orbit (752–767 km)	
	Cosmic Hot Interstellar Spectrometer (CHIPS)	NASA	13 Jan 2003	11 Apr 2008	Earth orbit (578–594 km)	
	Galaxy Evolution Explorer (GALEX)	NASA	28 Apr 2003	28 Jun 2013	Earth orbit (691–697 km)	.
	Korea Advanced Institute of Science and Technology Satellite 4 (Kaistsat 4)	KARI	27 Sep 2003	2007?	Earth orbit (675–695 km)	
	Neil Gehrels Swift Observatory (Swift)	NASA	20 Nov 2004	23 Oct 2026	Earth orbit (585–604 km)	
	Interface Region Imaging Spectrograph (IRIS)	NASA	27 Jun 2013	—	Earth orbit (387–415 km)	
	Hisaki (SPRINT-A)	JAXA	14 Sep 2013	8 December 2023	Earth orbit (957–1151 km)	
	Venus Spectral Rocket Experiment	NASA	26 Nov 2013	reusable	Suborbital to 300 km	
	Lunar-based ultraviolet telescope (LUT)	CNSA	1 Dec 2013	—	Lunar surface (On Chang'e 3 lander)	
	AstroSat	ISRO	28 Sep 2015	—	Earth orbit (600–650 km)	
	Spatial Heterodyne Interferometric Emission Line Dynamics Spectrometer (SHIELDS)	NASA	19 Apr 2021	19 Apr 2021	Suborbital to 284.8 km	
	Colorado Ultraviolet Transit Experiment (CUTE)	NASA, Colorado University	27 Sep 2021		nearly Sun-synchronous orbit with a ~90 minute orbital period	
	Carruthers Geocorona Observatory	NASA	24 Sep 2025		L_{1} Lagrange point	
	SPARCS	NASA	11 Jan 2026	—	Geocentric orbit	

UV ranges listed at Ultraviolet astronomy#Ultraviolet space telescopes.

== Visible light ==
The oldest form of astronomy, optical or visible-light astronomy, observes wavelengths of light from approximately 400 to 700 nm. Positioning an optical telescope in space eliminates the distortions and limitations that hamper that ground-based optical telescopes (see Astronomical seeing), providing higher resolution images. Optical telescopes are used to look at planets, stars, galaxies, planetary nebulae and protoplanetary disks, amongst many other things.

Photo	Name	Space agency	Launch date	Terminated	Location	Ref(s)
	Hipparcos	ESA	8 Aug 1989	Mar 1993	Earth orbit (223–35,632 km)	
	Hubble Space Telescope	NASA & ESA	24 Apr 1990	—	Earth orbit (586.47–610.44 km)	
	MOST	CSA	30 Jun 2003	Mar 2019	Earth orbit (819–832 km)	
	Neil Gehrels Swift Observatory	NASA	20 Nov 2004	23 Oct 2026	Earth orbit (585–604 km)	
	COROT	CNES & ESA	27 Dec 2006	2013	Earth orbit (872–884 km)	
	Kepler	NASA	6 Mar 2009	30 Oct 2018	Earth-trailing heliocentric orbit	
	BRITE constellation	Austria, Canada, Poland	25 Feb 2013 - 19 Aug 2014	—	Earth orbit	
	Near Earth Object Surveillance Satellite (NEOSSat)	CSA, DRDC	25 Feb 2013	—	Sun-synchronous Earth orbit (776–792 km)	
	Gaia (astrometry)	ESA	19 Dec 2013	27 Mar 2025	Sun-Earth L_{2} Lagrange point	
	AstroSat	ISRO	28 Sep 2015	—	Earth orbit (600–650 km)	
	Transiting Exoplanet Survey Satellite (TESS)	NASA	18 Apr 2018	—	High Earth Orbit	
	CHEOPS	ESA	18 Dec 2019	—	Sun-synchronous orbit	
	ILO-X	ILOA	15 Feb 2024	—	Lunar surface	
	Space Variable Objects Monitor (SVOM)	CNSA & CNES	22 Jun 2024	—	Earth orbit (625–625 km)	
	Nancy Grace Roman Space Telescope	NASA	30 Aug 2026	—	Sun–Earth L_{2} Lagrange point	

== Infrared and submillimetre ==
Infrared light is of lower energy than visible light, hence is emitted by sources that are either cooler, or moving away from the observer (in present context: Earth) at high speed. As such, the following can be viewed in the infrared: cool stars (including brown dwarves), nebulae, and redshifted galaxies.

Photo	Name	Space agency	Launch date	Terminated	Location	Ref(s)
	IRAS	NASA	25 Jan 1983	21 Nov 1983	Earth orbit (889–903 km)	
	Infrared Telescope in Space	ISAS & NASDA	18 Mar 1995	25 Apr 1995	Earth orbit (486 km)	
	Infrared Space Observatory (ISO)	ESA	17 Nov 1995	16 May 1998	Earth orbit (1000–70500 km)	
	Midcourse Space Experiment (MSX)	USN	24 Apr 1996	26 Feb 1997	Earth orbit (900 km)	
	Submillimeter Wave Astronomy Satellite (SWAS)	NASA	6 Dec 1998	Last used in 2005	Earth orbit (638–651 km)	
	Wide Field Infrared Explorer (WIRE)	NASA	5 Mar 1999	no observations	Re-entered May 10, 2011	
	Spitzer Space Telescope	NASA	25 Aug 2003	30 Jan 2020	Solar orbit (0.98–1.02 AU)	
	Akari (Astro-F)	JAXA	21 Feb 2006	24 Nov 2011	Earth orbit (586.47–610.44 km)	
	Herschel Space Observatory	ESA & NASA	14 May 2009	29 Apr 2013	Sun-Earth L_{2} Lagrange point	
	Wide-field Infrared Survey Explorer (WISE)	NASA	14 Dec 2009	(hibernation Feb 2011 – Aug 2013) Last contact 31 July 2024	Earth orbit (500 km)	
	CHEOPS	ESA	18 Dec 2019	—	Sun-synchronous orbit	
	James Webb Space Telescope (JWST)	NASA/ESA/CSA	25 Dec 2021	—	Sun–Earth L_{2} Lagrange point	
	Euclid	ESA	1 Jul 2023	—	Sun–Earth L_{2} Lagrange point	
	SPHEREx	NASA	11 Mar 2025	—	Earth orbit	
	Pandora	NASA	11 Jan 2026	—	Geocentric orbit	
	Nancy Grace Roman Space Telescope	NASA	30 Aug 2026	—	Sun–Earth L_{2} Lagrange point	

== Microwave ==
Microwave space telescopes have primarily been used to measure cosmological parameters from the Cosmic Microwave Background. They also measure synchrotron radiation, free-free emission and spinning dust from the Milky Way Galaxy, as well as extragalactic compact sources and galaxy clusters through the Sunyaev-Zel'dovich effect.

Photo	Name	Space agency	Launch date	Terminated	Location	Ref(s)
	Cosmic Background Explorer (COBE)	NASA	18 Nov 1989	23 Dec 1993	Earth orbit (900 km)	
	Odin	Swedish Space Corporation	20 Feb 2001	3 Aug 2026	Earth orbit (622 km)	
	WMAP	NASA	30 Jun 2001	Oct 2010	Sun-Earth L_{2} Lagrange point	
	Planck	ESA	14 May 2009	Oct 2013	Sun-Earth L_{2} Lagrange point	

== Radio ==
As the atmosphere is transparent for radio waves, radio telescopes in space are most useful for Very Long Baseline Interferometry: doing simultaneous observations of a source with both a satellite and a ground-based telescope and by correlating their signals to simulate a radio telescope the size of the separation between the two telescopes. Typical targets for observations include supernova remnants, masers, gravitational lenses, and starburst galaxies.

Photo	Name	Space agency	Launch date	Terminated	Location	Ref(s)
	Highly Advanced Laboratory for Communications and Astronomy (HALCA, VSOP or MUSES-B)	ISAS	12 Feb 1997	30 Nov 2005	Earth orbit (560–21,400 km)	
	Spektr-R (RadioAstron)	ASC LPI	18 Jul 2011	11 Jan 2019	Earth orbit (10,000–390,000 km)	

== Particle detection ==
Spacecraft and space-based modules that do particle detection, looking for cosmic rays and electrons. These can be emitted by the Sun (Solar Energetic Particles), the Milky Way galaxy (Galactic cosmic rays) and extragalactic sources (Extragalactic cosmic rays). There are also Ultra-high-energy cosmic rays from active galactic nuclei, those can be detected by ground-based detectors via their particle showers.

Photo	Name	Space agency	Launch date	Terminated	Location	Ref(s)
	Proton-1	USSR	16 Jul 1965	11 Oct 1965	Earth orbit (589–183 km)	
	Proton-2	USSR	2 Nov 1965	6 Feb 1966	Earth orbit (637–191 km)	
	High Energy Astronomy Observatory 3 (HEAO 3)	NASA	20 Sep 1979	29 May 1981	Earth orbit (486.4–504.9 km)	
	SAMPEX	NASA / DE	3 Jul 1992	30 Jun 2004	Earth orbit (512–687 km)	
	Alpha Magnetic Spectrometer 01 (AMS-01)	NASA	2 Jun 1998	12 Jun 1998	Earth orbit (296 km)	
	Payload for Antimatter Matter Exploration and Light-nuclei Astrophysics (PAMELA)	ISA, INFN, RSA, DLR & SNSB	15 May 2006	7 Feb 2016	Earth orbit (350–610 km)	
	IBEX	NASA	19 Oct 2008	—	Earth orbit (86,000–259,000 km)	
	Alpha Magnetic Spectrometer 02 (AMS-02)	NASA	16 May 2011	—	Earth orbit (353 km) on ISS	
	Calorimetric Electron Telescope (CALET)	JAXA	19 Oct 2015	—	Earth orbit (353 km) on ISS	
	Dark Matter Particle Explorer (DAMPE)	CNSA & CAS	17 Dec 2015	—	Earth orbit (500 km)	

== Gravitational waves ==
A type of telescope that detects gravitational waves; ripples in space-time generated by colliding neutron stars or black holes.

Photo	Name	Space agency	Launch date	Terminated	Location	Ref(s)
	Lunar Surface Gravimeter	NASA	7 Dec 1972	14 Dec 1972	Taurus–Littrow	

== Future launches ==
Photo	Name	Space agency	Type of observation	Planned launch date	Location	Ref(s)
	Gamma-ray Transients Monitor	TASA	Gamma ray	2026		
	Xuntian	CNSA/CAS	Visible light/Terahertz radiation	2026	Low Earth orbit	
	Aspera	NASA	UV	2027	Low Earth orbit	
	CubeSpec	ESA	Visible light/UV	2027	Low Earth orbit	
	PLATO	ESA	Visible light (planet transits)	2027	Sun–Earth L2 Lagrange point	
	ULTRASAT	Israel Space Agency	Near-ultraviolet	2027	Sun–Earth L_{2} Lagrange point	
	Compton Spectrometer and Imager	NASA	Soft gamma-rays	2027	Low Earth orbit	
	NEO Surveyor	NASA	Infrared (Near-Earth object detection)	2027	Sun–Earth L_{1} Lagrange point	
	ARIEL	ESA	Visible light/Near-infrared	2029	Sun–Earth L_{2} Lagrange point	
	UVEX	NASA	Ultraviolet	2030	Highly elliptical orbit	
	ARRAKIHS	ESA	Visible light/Near-infrared	2030	Low Earth orbit	
	Taiji	CNSA/CAS	Gravitational waves	2033	Heliocentric orbit	
	PRIMA	NASA	Far infrared	2033	Sun-Earth L_{2} orbit	
	NEOMIR	ESA	Infrared (Near-Earth object detection)	2030s	Sun–Earth L_{1} Lagrange point	
	Athena	ESA/NASA/JAXA	X-rays	2037	Sun–Earth L_{2} Lagrange point	
	LISA	ESA	Gravitational waves	2037	Heliocentric orbit	

== See also ==
- List of proposed space telescopes
- List of heliophysics missions
- List of solar telescopes
- Lists of telescopes
- Lists of spacecraft
- Great Observatories program
