= Broad Band X-ray Telescope =

Space Shuttle instrument

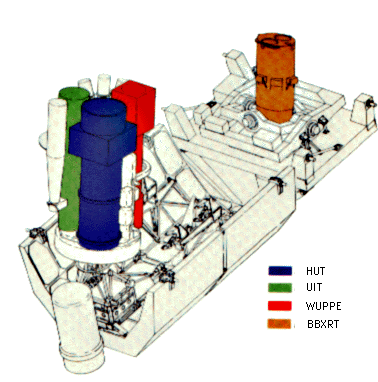
Diagram of Astro-1 instruments with BBXRT on the right

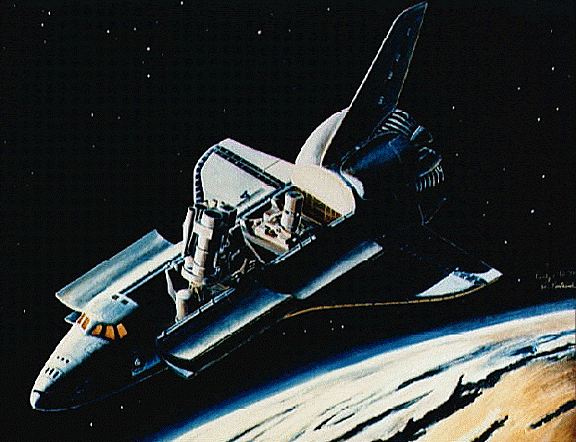
Astro-1 payload in the Shuttle Bay illustration

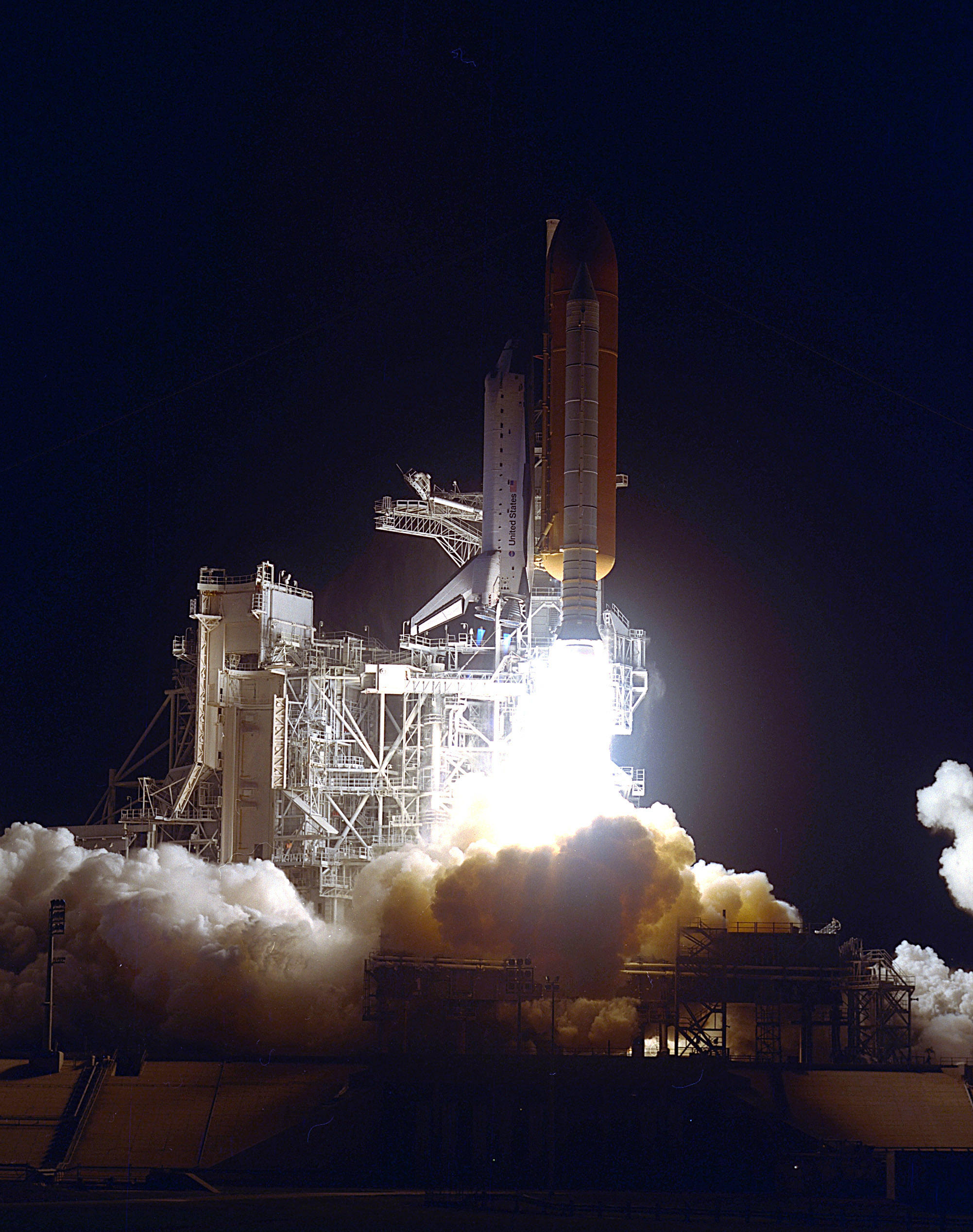
STS-35, carrying ASTRO-1 with the BBXT heads into orbit, 1990

The Broad Band X-ray Telescope (BBXRT) was flown on the Space Shuttle Columbia (STS-35) from December 2 through December 11, 1990 as part of the ASTRO-1 payload. The flight of BBXRT marked the first opportunity for performing X-ray observations over a broad energy range (0.3-12 keV) with a moderate energy resolution (typically 90 eV and 150 eV at 1 and 6 keV, respectively).

BBXRT was co-mounted with three ultraviolet telescopes HUT, WUPPE, and HIT for Astro-1 in 1990.

This was, "..the first focusing X-ray telescope operating over a broad energy range 0.3-12 keV with a moderate energy resolution (90 eV at 1 keV and 150eV at 6 keV)." according to NASA.

== Hardware ==
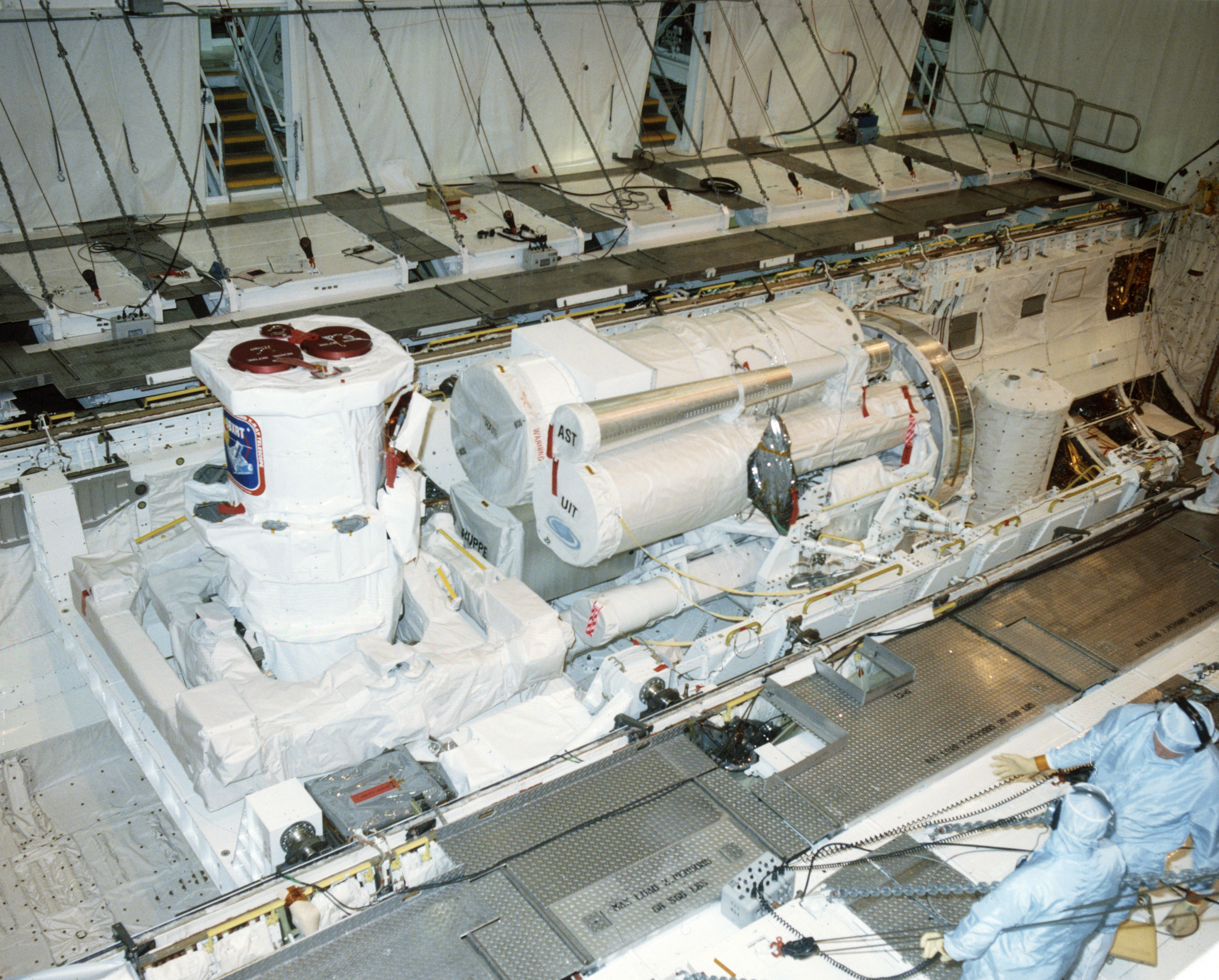
Broad Band X-ray Telescope is on the left in this case, separately from the other grouping

== See also ==
- Spacelab
- X-ray astronomy
- List of X-ray space telescopes
