= Colorado Ultraviolet Transit Experiment =

UV space telescope launched in 2021

Colorado Ultraviolet Transit Experiment (CUTE) is a small UV space telescope to study selected exoplanets.

It was launched as a rideshare on the Atlas V that launched Landsat 9 on September 27, 2021. Designed to operate for at least 8 months and study 10 exoplanets, CUTE remains operational as of December 2023, 27 months after launch. The spacecraft is expected to remain in orbit until 2027.

CUTE can measure near-UV (255-330 nm) and do low resolution spectroscopy of atmospheric tracers (eg. Fe II, Mg II, Mg I, OH).

The UV sensor is a 2048 x 515 pixel CCD array, with the spectrum lengthwise across the sensor. The 515 pixel width provides tolerance from sensor damage.

== See also ==
- Ultraviolet astronomy
- List of space telescopes
