= UVEX =

NASA satellite of the Explorer program

Ultraviolet Explorer
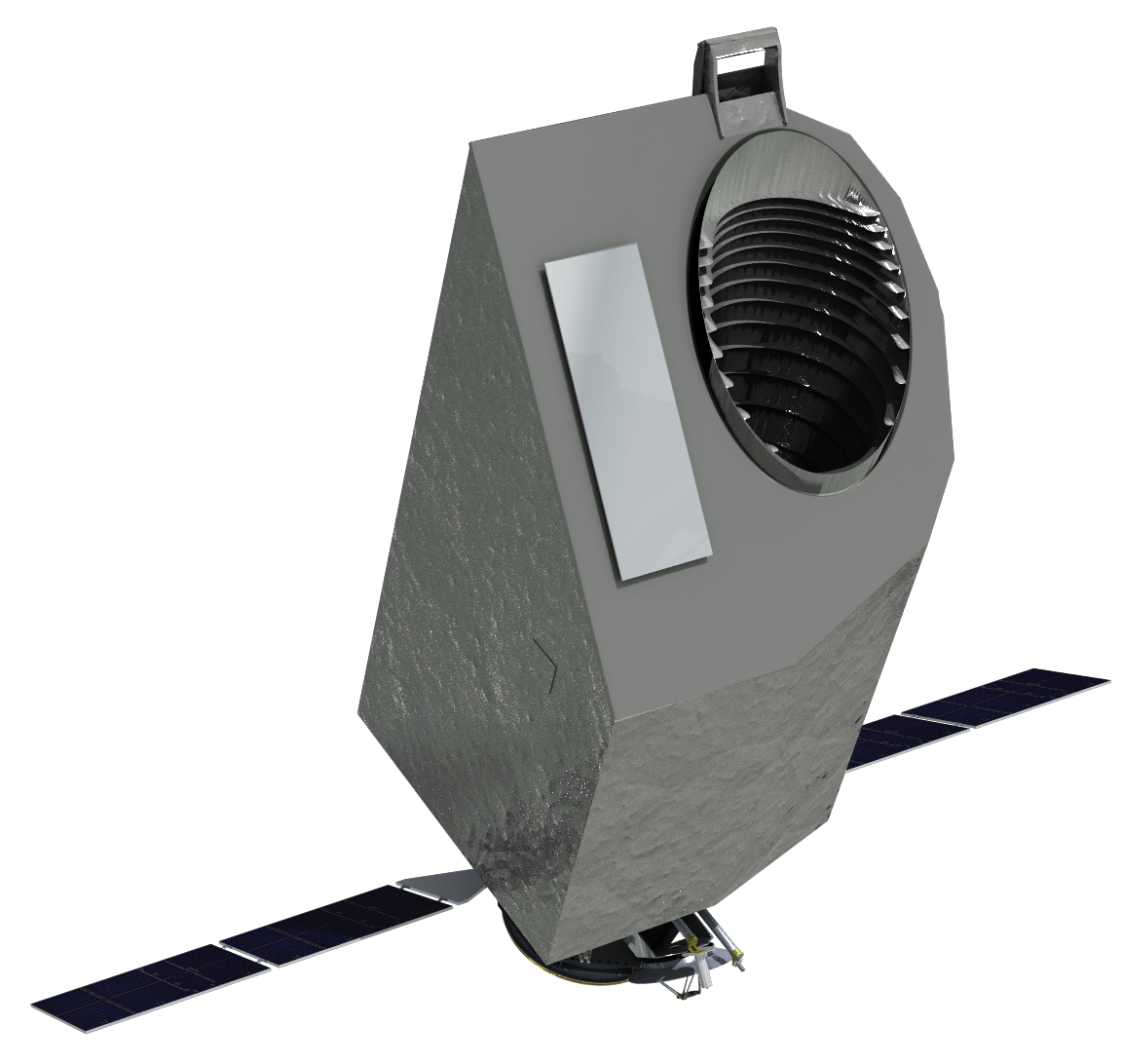
- UVEX spacecraft render
- Mission type: Ultraviolet astronomy
- Operator: NASA / Goddard, Caltech
- Website: https://www.uvex.caltech.edu/
- Mission duration: 2 years (planned)

Start of mission
- Launch date: 2030 (planned)

Orbital parameters
- Reference system: Geocentric orbit
- Regime: Highly elliptical orbit
- Perigee altitude: 104,000 km (65,000 mi)
- Apogee altitude: 396,000 km (246,000 mi)
- Period: 13.7 days

Main telescope
- Type: Three-mirror anastigmat
- Diameter: 75 cm (30 in)
- Focal length: f/2.7
- Wavelengths: 139–190 nm (FUV imager); 203–270 nm (NUV imager); 115–265 nm (spectrograph)
- Resolution: 2.25 arcsecond (imager); R ≥ 1000 (spectrograph)

Instruments
- Ultraviolet telescope

The Ultraviolet Explorer (UVEX) is an upcoming wide-field ultraviolet space telescope from NASA scheduled to launch in 2030. UVEX will build upon previous ultraviolet space telescopes, specifically GALEX, conducting surveys of the entire sky in both near- and far-ultraviolet light. UVEX will study the evolution of low-metallicity stars and how they affect the evolution of low-metallicity and low-mass galaxies. The probe can also be used for quick-turnaround observation of cosmic events, such as merging stars. UVEX's data will be able to complement other all-sky survey programs in different wavelengths of light, notably those by the Vera C. Rubin Observatory, the Nancy Grace Roman Space Telescope, and Euclid. Compared to earlier ultraviolet space telescopes, UVEX will feature more capable instrumentation and a larger mirror, enabling it to obtain higher-resolution data and observe fainter objects.

== Spacecraft ==
=== Science payload ===
UVEX will contain one instrument, consisting of the UV-optimized optical telescope array (OTA) and the UV Instrument Module (UVIM). The OTA consists of a 75 cm (30 in)-diameter primary mirror in a three-mirror anastigmat configuration which will capture and redirect light to three different sensors.

- Two of these belong to the imager, with one featuring coatings to only accept near-ultraviolet (NUV) light, with its counterpart accepting only far-ultraviolet (FUV) light. Both sensors, each consisting of nine 4k x 4k CMOS detectors arranged in a 3 x 3 pattern, are identical apart from their coatings and will receive light from a dichroic, which splits the light beam from the OTA to send each sensor its corresponding wavelengths of light. The dichroic allows both sensor assemblies to image simultaneously. Due to the low focal ratio of the OTA and the large sensors, the imager can capture 3.5° x 3.5° images of the sky at once.
- The third sensor, a single 4k x 4k detector, belongs to the long-slit spectrograph. Light from the OTA would reach the detector by bypassing the dichroic and passing through the slit and grating. The spectrograph has a length of 2° and can achieve a maximum resolving power of roughly R = 3500.

== Mission ==
UVEX is classified as a Medium-Class Explorer (MIDEX) in NASA's Explorers Program and is planned to launch in 2030. After a period of orbit corrections and instrument commissioning, the probe will begin a two-year series of full-sky surveys. Because of its larger primary mirror, which can capture more light at once than the smaller mirrors of its predecessors, UVEX will observe dimmer and further objects. The probe will reach AB magnitudes greater than 25.8, comparable to the ground-based Vera C. Rubin Observatory. UVEX will also perform weekly surveys of the Magellanic Clouds, something its predecessors struggled with because of their brightness.

UVEX's science goals are divided into three "pillars:"

- Study low-metallicity stars and their effects on the evolution of their host galaxies. Low-metallicity low-mass galaxies make up about half of the universe's mass, and they are believed to be very similar to the first galaxies that formed. Studying these objects can give insight into how the first stars and galaxies formed just after the Big Bang
- Study ongoing and new events in the universe with time-domain surveys, allowing quick follow-up to sudden events like stellar mergers. This will provide additional data to ongoing studies of gravitational waves.
- Create a dataset of ultraviolet all-sky surveys for use by current and future scientists, complementing similar surveys by telescopes in other wavelengths of light (primarily infrared and visible light)

=== Orbit ===
UVEX will operate in a highly elliptical lunar resonance orbit called P/2. This type of orbit is currently in use by the TESS spacecraft, which is also performing whole-sky surveys, although TESS is primarily searching for exoplanets. The P/2 orbit is in a 2:1 resonance with the Moon, meaning that the spacecraft completes two orbits of Earth for every one orbit of the Moon. Because of this resonance, which enables occasional gravitational interactions with the Moon, the orbit is extremely stable. In addition, the orbit avoids the Van Allen belts entirely, drastically reducing wear on spacecraft components. Because of its high altitude and eccentricity, UVEX will take 13.7 days to complete one orbit.

== See also ==
- Explorer program – Ongoing NASA space exploration program
- Ultraviolet astronomy
- GALEX – NASA UV space telescope of the Explorer program, operated 2003-2013
