= Pandora (spacecraft) =

NASA small satellite mission to study exoplanet atmospheres

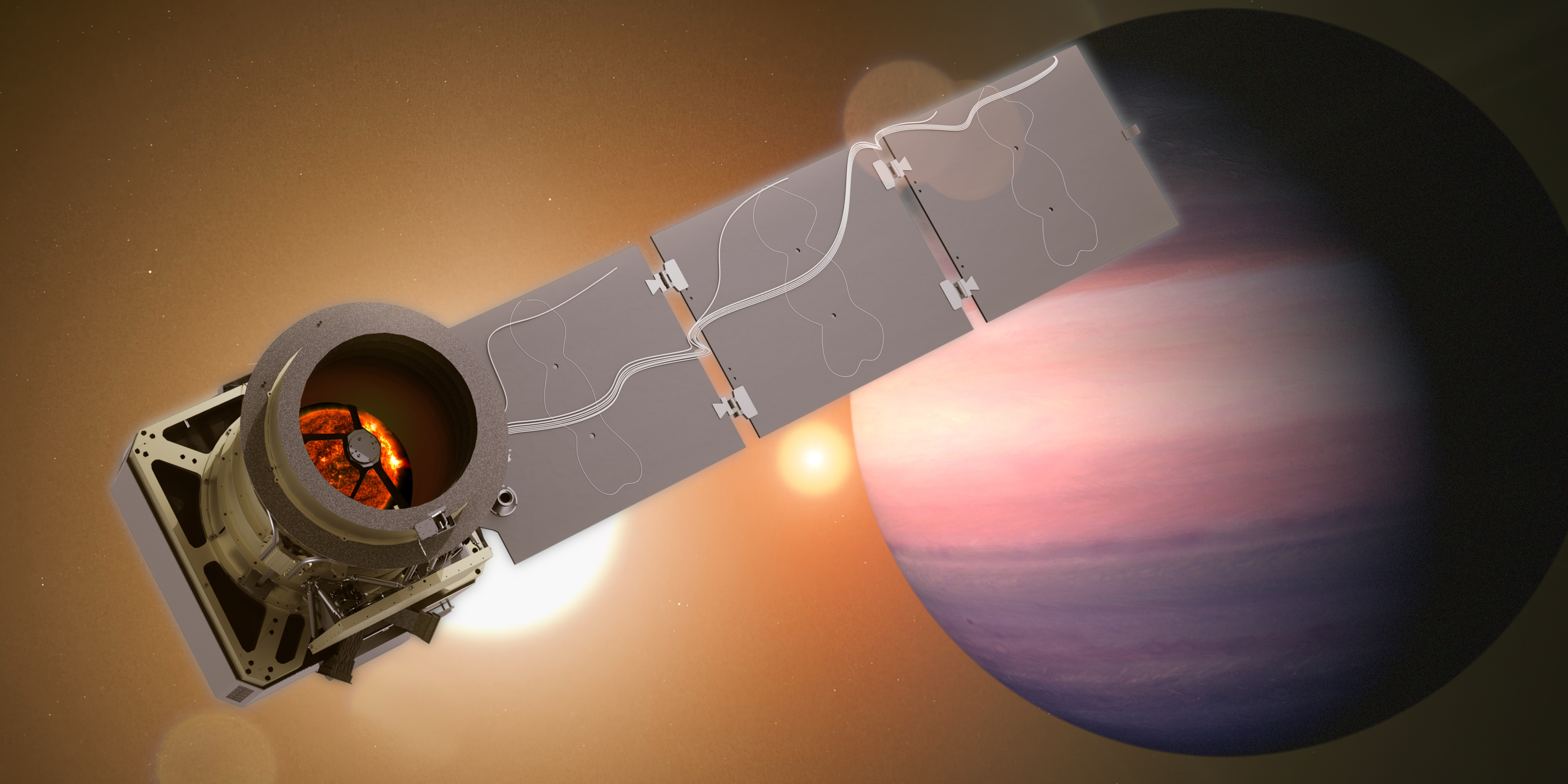
- Artist’s concept of Pandora mission
- Mission type: Space telescope (Astrophysics)
- Operator: NASA / U of A
- COSPAR ID: 2026-004AJ
- SATCAT no.: 67395
- Website: https://science.nasa.gov/mission/pandora/
- Mission duration: 1 year (planned science operations)

Spacecraft properties
- Manufacturer: Lawrence Livermore National Laboratory, Corning, Blue Canyon Technologies
- Launch mass: 325 kg (717 lb)

Start of mission
- Launch date: 11 January 2026 at 13:44 UTC
- Rocket: Falcon 9
- Contractor: SpaceX

Orbital parameters
- Reference system: Geocentric orbit
- Regime: Sun-synchronous low Earth orbit
- Altitude: 600 km (370 mi) (planned)

Main telescope
- Diameter: 45 cm (18 in)
- Wavelengths: Visible and near-infrared

Instruments
- Visible photometer; near-infrared spectrograph

Pandora is a NASA small satellite space telescope designed to study the atmospheres of transiting exoplanets (exoplanets that pass in front of their host stars). Pandora will also help identify exoplanet targets worthy of more in-depth atmospheric studies by JWST and future space telescopes designed to search for signs of life. The spacecraft launched on January 11, 2026 aboard a SpaceX rideshare mission "Twilight" into a Sun-synchronous low Earth orbit to carry out about one year of science operations.

== Science objectives ==
During a planetary transit, a small fraction of starlight passes through the planet's atmosphere before reaching a telescope. Measuring how the light from the star changes during such a transit can provide insights into the planet's atmosphere. However, starspots and other features on the star can also affect the measured spectrum and mimic or hide atmospheric features.

Pandora's primary objective is to measure and correct for this "stellar contamination" by combining long-term visible-light monitoring of each host star with simultaneous near-infrared spectroscopy taken during transits. After accounting for the host star's variability, the mission aims to identify planets with hydrogen- or water-dominated atmospheres and to determine which planets are likely covered by clouds or hazes.

== Spacecraft ==
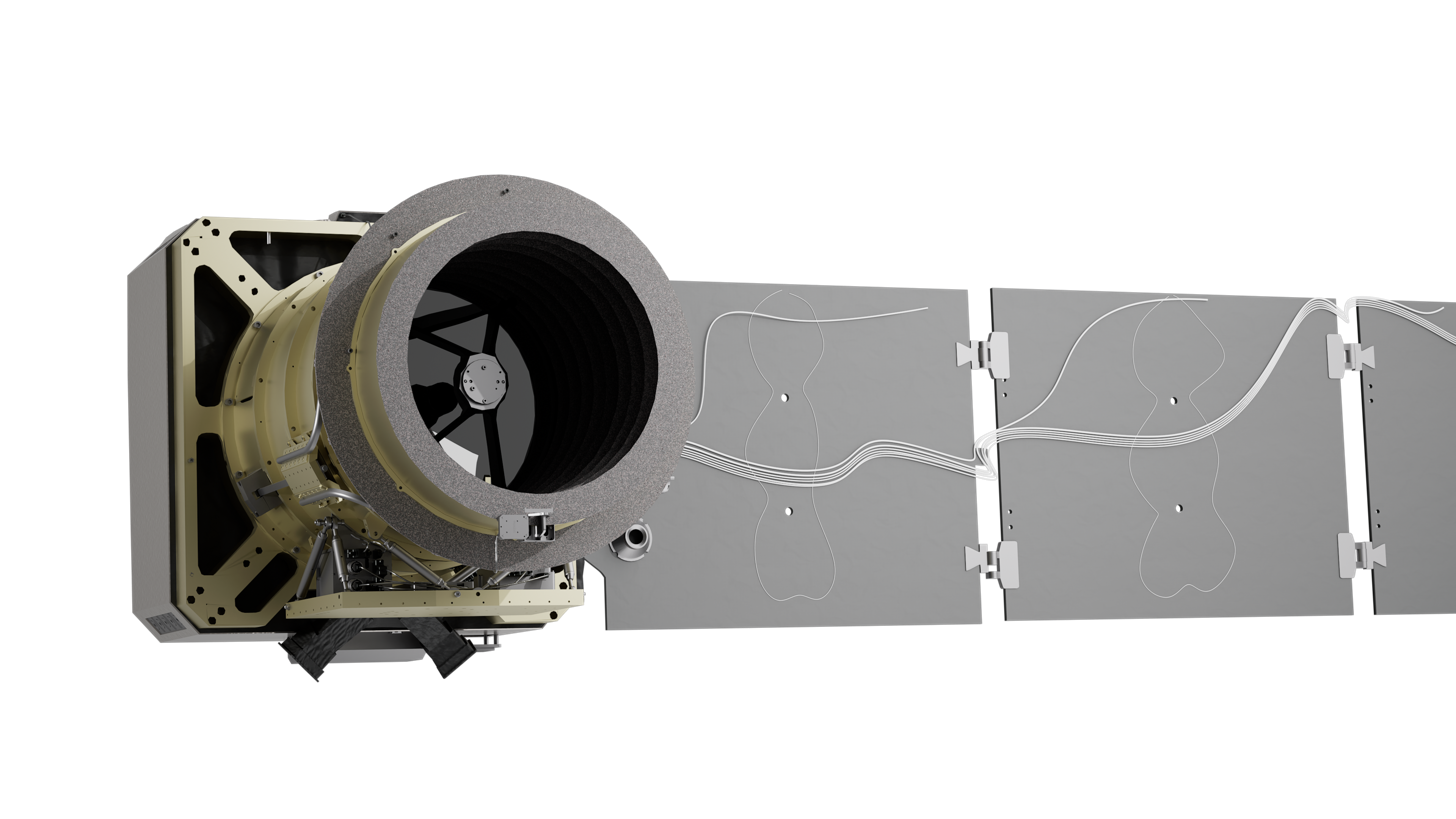
Spacecraft model

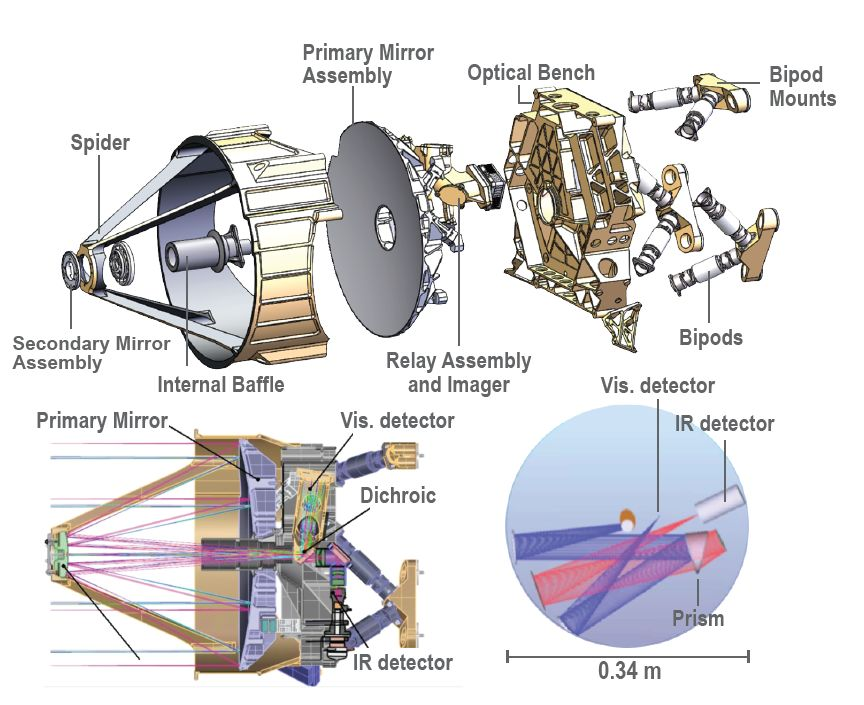
Pandora CODA telescope concept

Fully integrated Pandora spacecraft. Visible are star trackers (center), multilayer insulation blankets (white), the end of the telescope (top), and the solar panel (right) in its launch configuration.

=== Observatory and instruments ===
Pandora's payload is built around an all-aluminum Cassegrain telescope with a 45 cm (18 in) aperture and a baffle to reduce stray light. A beam-splitting mirror sends visible light to a photometer while directing near-infrared light to a spectrograph, allowing both measurements to be taken at the same time.

Pandora's visible wavelength channel measures brightness changes from about 0.38-0.75 μm, while the near-infrared channel collects spectra from about 0.87-1.63 μm. The near-infrared detector is a Teledyne HAWAII-2RG sensor originally built as a flight spare for the James Webb Space Telescope Near Infrared Camera (NIRCam). For stable infrared measurements, the detector is cooled to below 110 K (−163 °C; −262 °F) using a cryocooler and thermal-control system.

=== Partners and operations centers ===
The payload is developed by Lawrence Livermore National Laboratory and partners, and the spacecraft bus is supplied by Blue Canyon Technologies. NASA's Goddard Space Flight Center provided the infrared detector and detector electronics. The University of Arizona is responsible for mission operations, while NASA's Ames Research Center leads data processing, archiving, and distribution.

== Mission profile ==
Pandora operates in a Sun-synchronous low Earth orbit at roughly 600 km (370 mi) altitude, enabling access to the entire sky over the course of a year. After an initial checkout and commissioning period of about one month, the mission's prime science phase is planned to last one year, with the possibility of an extended mission.

Its primary mission objective is to observe at least 20 transiting exoplanets, collecting a minimum of 10 transit observations per target (more than 200 transits total). Each observing visit typically lasts about 24 hours and can span multiple orbits. The mission will also use observations from ground-based observatories to refine transit timing and track long-term variability of each host star, including from NASA's Exoplanet Watch citizen science initiative.

== Development and launch ==
Pandora was selected in 2021 as part of NASA's Astrophysics Pioneers program, which has a cost cap of $20 million for each mission. The project completed its Critical Design Review in October 2023 and began fabrication, assembly, and testing thereafter. In February 2025, NASA selected SpaceX to provide launch services on a Falcon 9 rocket. In early 2025, NASA reported the spacecraft bus had been completed and integration and testing were continuing toward launch readiness.

Pandora launched aboard a rideshare mission, along with 39 other payloads, on 11 January 2026 at 5:44 AM local time (13:44 UTC) from Vandenberg Space Force Base in Santa Barbara County, California, and it was deployed 2 hours, 28 minutes, and 57 seconds later. Two other CubeSat space telescopes were launched together with Pandora: BlackCAT (Black Hole Coded Aperture Telescope) and SPARCS (Star-Planet Activity Research CubeSat). Pandora successfully established contact after launch.
