= BlackCAT =

NASA's small satellite space telescope for X-ray astronomy

- Mission type: Space telescope (Astrophysics)
- Operator: NASA
- COSPAR ID: 2026-004?
- SATCAT no.: 673??
- Mission duration: 14 months (planned); 10 months, 8 days (in progress)

Spacecraft properties
- Manufacturer: Penn State

Start of mission
- Launch date: 11 January 2026, 13:44:50 UTC
- Rocket: Falcon 9 (booster 1097)
- Launch site: Vandenberg Space Launch Complex 4
- Contractor: SpaceX

Orbital parameters
- Reference system: Geocentric
- Regime: Dawn/dusk sun-synchronous orbit
- Altitude: 500 to 600 km

BlackCAT (Black Hole Coded Aperture Telescope) is a small X-ray astronomy space telescope in the form of a 6U CubeSat developed by NASA and Penn State. Its objective is to observe gamma ray bursts, counterparts to multi-messenger events, and other high energy transient astronomical events. The spacecraft launched on 11 January 2026 on a Falcon 9 rideshare mission "Twilight" together with two other astronomy mission by NASA: Pandora and SPARCS. The spacecraft is expected to undergo two months of in-orbit commissioning followed by a one year science mission. Its orbital lifetime is expected to be approximately 10 years.
