= George Robert Carruthers =

American physicist and engineer (1939–2020)

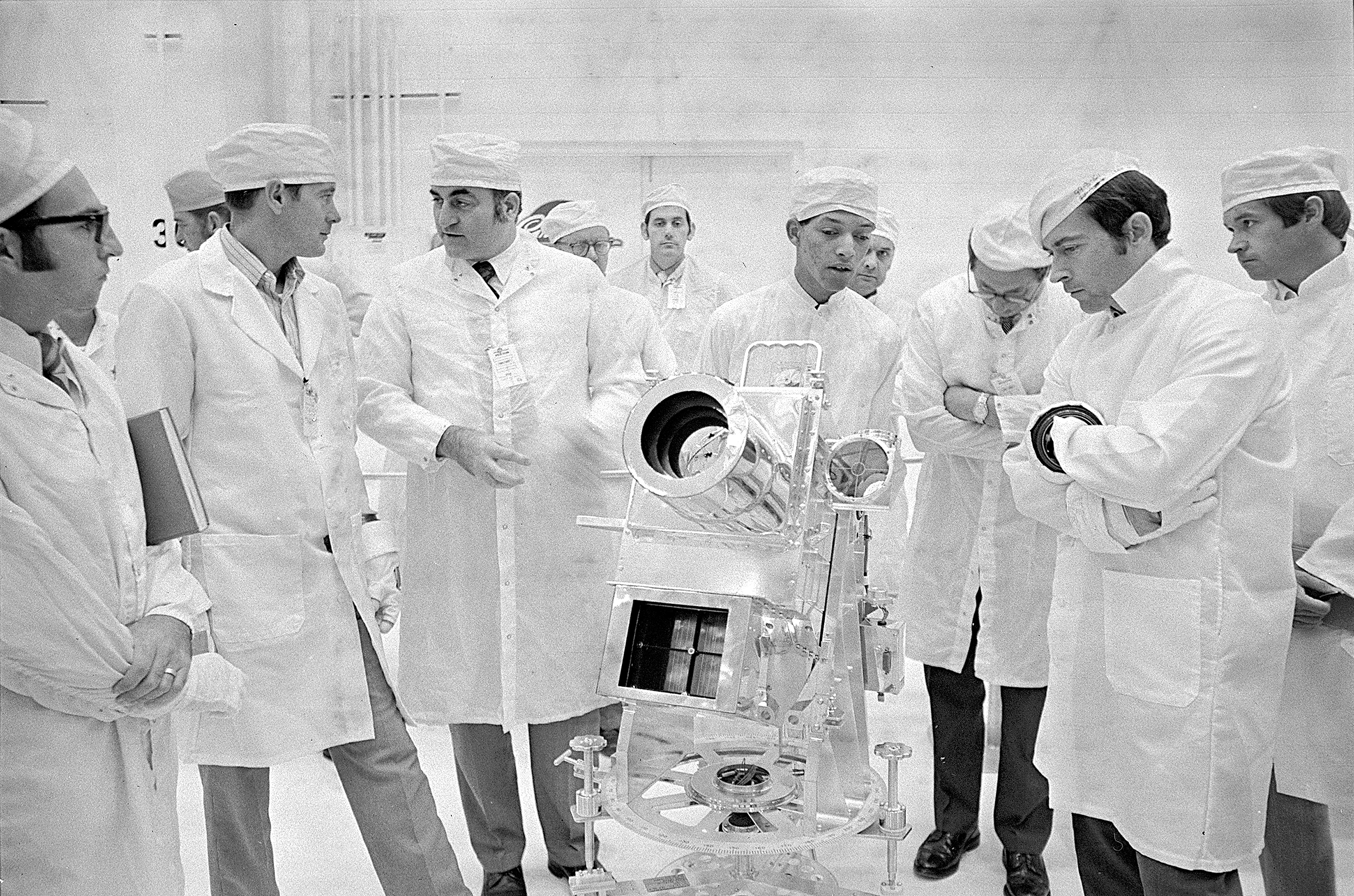
- George Carruthers, center, discusses the Lunar Surface Ultraviolet Camera with Apollo 16 Commander John Young, right. From left are Lunar Module Pilot Charles Duke and Rocco Petrone, Apollo Program Director.
- Born: October 1, 1939; Cincinnati, Ohio, U.S.
- Died: December 26, 2020 (aged 81); Washington, D.C., U.S.
- Citizenship: American
- Education: University of Illinois at Urbana-Champaign
- Known for: Invention of the ultraviolet camera/spectrograph
- Awards: Arthur S. Flemming Award, 1970; National Medal of Technology and Innovation, 2011
- Scientific career
- Fields: Physics
- Workplaces: United States Naval Research Laboratory
- Thesis: Experimental investigations of atomic nitrogen recombination (1964)

George Robert Carruthers (October 1, 1939 – December 26, 2020) was an American space physicist and engineer. Carruthers perfected a compact and very powerful ultraviolet camera/spectrograph for NASA to use when it launched Apollo 16 in 1972. Carruthers was inducted into the National Inventors Hall of Fame in 2003, and in 2011 he was awarded the National Medal for Technology and Invention.

== Early life and education ==
Carruthers was born on October 1, 1939, in Cincinnati, Ohio, to George and Sophia Carruthers. Carruthers was the eldest of four children. His father was a civil engineer with the Army Corps of Engineers and his mother was a homemaker. When Carruthers was young the family lived in the Evanston neighborhood before moving to Milford, Ohio.

At an early age, George developed an interest in space flight through reading popular space fiction like Buck Rodgers and the early 1950s Collier's series on space flight. Carruthers's father also encouraged his interests in math and science. At the age of 10, Carruthers built his first telescope out of cardboard tubing and lenses purchased using money he earned as a delivery boy. He did not perform well in elementary school, earning poor grades in math and physics. However, he won three separate science fair awards during this time.

Carruthers's father died when he was 12, after which his family moved to the South Side of Chicago where they stayed with relatives until he went to college. Carruthers enjoyed visiting Chicago museums, libraries, and the Adler Planetarium. After Sputnik he experimented with model rocketry, becoming a member of the junior division of the Chicago Rocket Society and various science clubs.

After graduating from Englewood High School, Carruthers entered the college of engineering at the University of Illinois at Urbana–Champaign, and received a Bachelor of Science degree in physics in 1961. Carruthers continued his graduate work at the University of Illinois Urbana-Champaign and earned a master's degree in nuclear engineering in 1962. Carruthers received a Ph.D. in aeronautical and astronautical engineering in 1964. For his Ph.D. Carruthers researched atomic nitrogen recombination.

== Career at the U.S. Naval Research Laboratory ==
In 1964, as he was completing his Ph.D. thesis, Carruthers was invited to give a colloquium talk at the United States Naval Research Laboratory. That year he became the first E. O. Hulburt Postdoctoral Fellow, funded by the National Science Foundation, and in 1967 transitioned to a permanent position. Carruthers worked in the Space Science Division under Herbert Friedman.

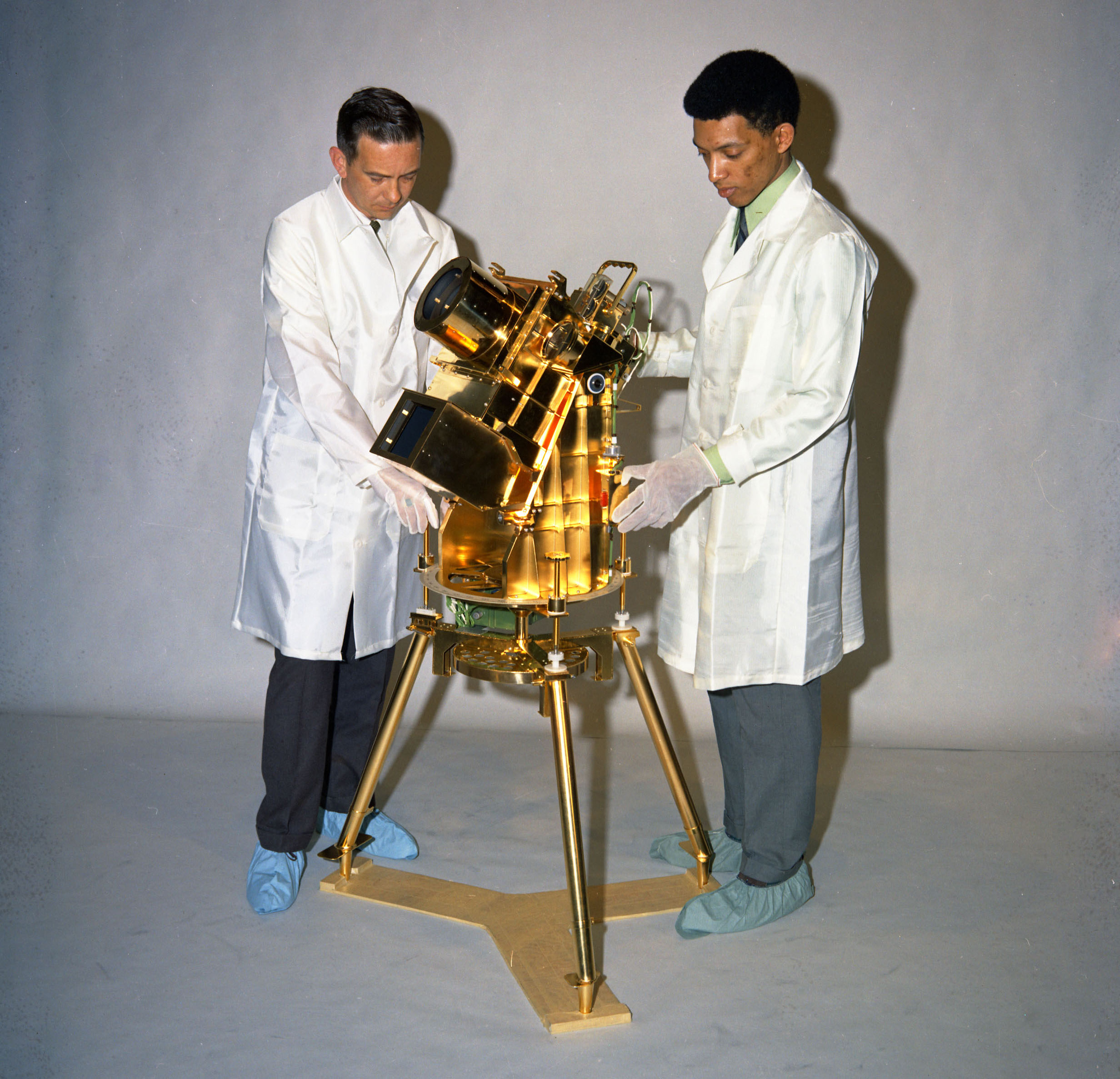
George Carruthers (right) and William Conway (left) examine the gold-plated Lunar Surface Ultraviolet Camera prior to the Apollo 16 mission

In 1966 Carruthers built, and in 1969 received a patent (US3478216) for, an image converter that turned images made from light of very short wavelengths into electron images. This enabled capturing an entire spectrum in a single exposure, and was more robust than traditional ultraviolet films because it used reflective cathodes rather than transmissive cathodes. On the first test flight of the image converter in 1970, it captured a far ultraviolet spectrum which was the first detection of molecular hydrogen in space. His design detected an upper limit to the amount of molecular hydrogen that exists in the interstellar medium, answering numerous questions astronomers were asking at that time about what was then referred to as the "missing mass" problem.

In 1969 NASA requested proposals for scientific experiments that could be conducted by astronauts on future lunar missions. Simultaneously but independently, Carruthers and Thornton Page proposed conducting ultraviolet imaging of the Earth. It was suggested by NASA that the two form a joint proposal, and this was approved with Carruthers as principal investigator and chief engineer and Page as the science lead.

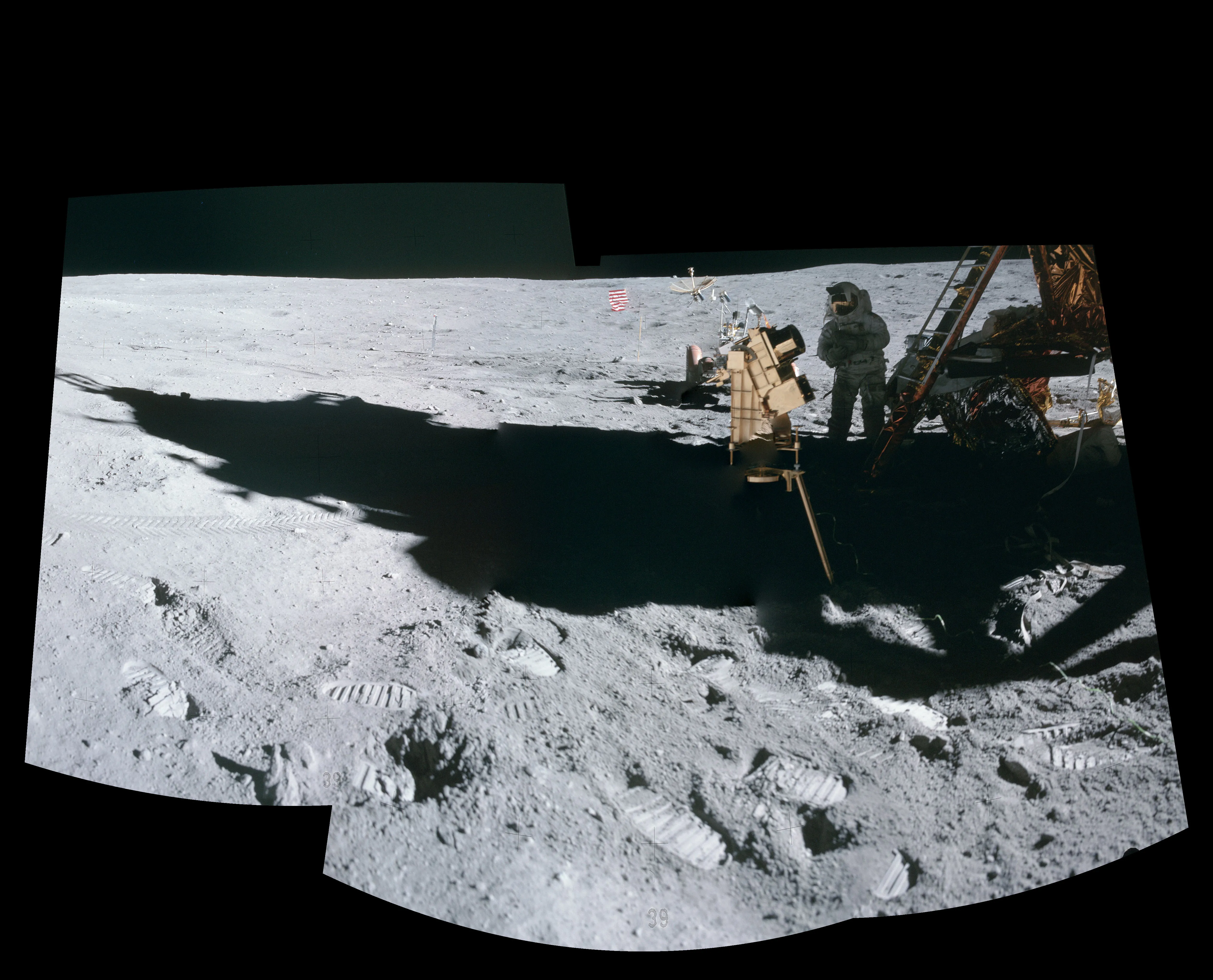
The gold-plated ultraviolet camera is brightly visible next to the moon lander in this assembled panorama shot taken on the Apollo 16 mission.

In April 20, 1972, the Apollo 16 mission with the Far Ultraviolet Camera/Spectrograph designed by Carruthers landed on the moon. This was the first telescope set up on another planetary body and was a larger, gold-plated, version of Carruthers's image converter. Astronaut John Young set up the telescope in the Descartes Highlands and, together with Charles Duke, collected data by manually pointing the telescope at the Earth and other targets. Nearly 200 images were taken, among them images of the Earth's polar auroras.

Among other projects, Carruthers's cameras were used to capture ultraviolet images of Halley's Comet and Comet Kohoutek. In 1991, he developed a camera that was used on the STS-39 Space Shuttle mission. He also continued his work on the polar auroras with an instrument called the Global Imaging Monitor of the Ionosphere, which launched in 1999 on the ARGOS (satellite).

Carruthers retired from the Naval Research Laboratory in 2002 at the rank of senior astrophysicist.

On February 12, 2009, Carruthers was honored as a distinguished lecturer at the Office of Naval Research for his achievements in the field of space science.

On February 1, 2013, Carruthers was awarded the 2012 National Medal of Technology and Innovation by President Barack Obama at the White House: "For invention of the Far UV Electrographic Camera, which significantly improved our understanding of space and earth science."

== Outreach work ==
During the 1980s, Carruthers helped create the Science & Engineers Apprentice Program, which allows high school students to spend a summer working with scientists at the Naval Research Laboratory. Carruthers also worked with the Naval Research Laboratory's community outreach organization, and as such helped support several educational activities in the sciences in the Washington D.C. area. During the summers of 1996 and 1997 he taught a course in earth and space science for D.C. public schools science teachers. He also helped develop a series of videotapes on earth and space science for high-school students.

Carruthers was involved in many initiatives to encourage involvement of African Americans in science and technology, such as Project SMART (formed by Congressman Mervyn [M.] Dymally), the National Society of Black Physicists, and the National Technical Association. He frequently participated in public observing events at Howard University and SMART Day programs at the National Air and Space Museum.

From 1983 onward he was the chairman of the editing and review committee and editor, Journal of the National Technical Association. This journal included biographical sketches and career profiles of prominent African American scientists and engineers, and was distributed to high schools and to colleges.

After retiring from NRL, Carruthers taught a two-semester course in earth and space science at Howard University sponsored by a NASA Aerospace Workforce Development Grant.

== Death and legacy ==
Carruthers died of congestive heart failure on December 26, 2020, in Washington D.C.

In 2022 NASA renamed the Global Lyman-alpha Imager of the Dynamic Exosphere mission, also known as GLIDE, to honor Carruthers. The mission was renamed to be the Carruthers Geocorona Observatory. This mission was launched in 2025 and observes the Earth's atmosphere in ultraviolet light. The renaming ceremony took place on December 2, 2022, at Carruthers's alma mater the University of Illinois at Urbana-Champaign.

== Honors and awards ==
- 1970 Arthur S. Flemming Award
- 1972 NASA Exceptional Scientific Achievement Medal
- 1973 Helen B. Warner Prize for Astronomy of the American Astronomical Society
- 1987 Black Engineer of the Year Award
- National Science Foundation Fellow
- Honorary Doctor of Engineering, Michigan Technological University
- 2003 Inducted into the National Inventors' Hall of Fame
- 2012 National Medal of Technology and Innovation

== External sources ==
From the Laboratory to the Moon: The Quiet Genius of George R. Carruthers by David DeVorkin
