= SPARCS =

Space telescope

- Mission type: Space telescope (Astrophysics)
- Operator: NASA
- COSPAR ID: 2026-004?
- SATCAT no.: 673??

Start of mission
- Launch date: 11 January 2026, 13:44:50 UTC
- Rocket: Falcon 9 (booster 1097)
- Launch site: Vandenberg Space Launch Complex 4
- Contractor: SpaceX

Orbital parameters
- Reference system: Geocentric
- Regime: Dawn/dusk sun-synchronous orbit
- Altitude: 500 to 600 km

SPARCS (Star-Planet Activity Research CubeSat) is a small space telescope in the CubeSat 6U format (30x20x10 cm at launch) whose objective is to monitor the flares and sunspot activity of low-mass stars of M and K spectral type. The mission selected by NASA is developed and managed by Arizona State University with the participation of the Jet Propulsion Laboratory (JPL) which provides the telescope and its detectors.

== Objectives ==
The objective of the SPARCS mission is to study the ultraviolet emissions of around ten red dwarfs in order to model its impact. SPARCS is with ASTERIA one of the first space astronomy missions using the extremely miniaturized CubeSat format. This new category of satellite opens up prospects in the field of long-term observations of astronomical phenomena thanks to their reduced cost.

== Timeline ==
SPARCS launched on 11 January 2026 on a Falcon 9 rideshare mission "Twilight" together with NASA's Pandora and BlackCAT telescopes. On 12 March 2026, NASA published the spaceraft's first light images taken on 6 February 2026.
