= Hisaki (satellite) =

Japanese satellite

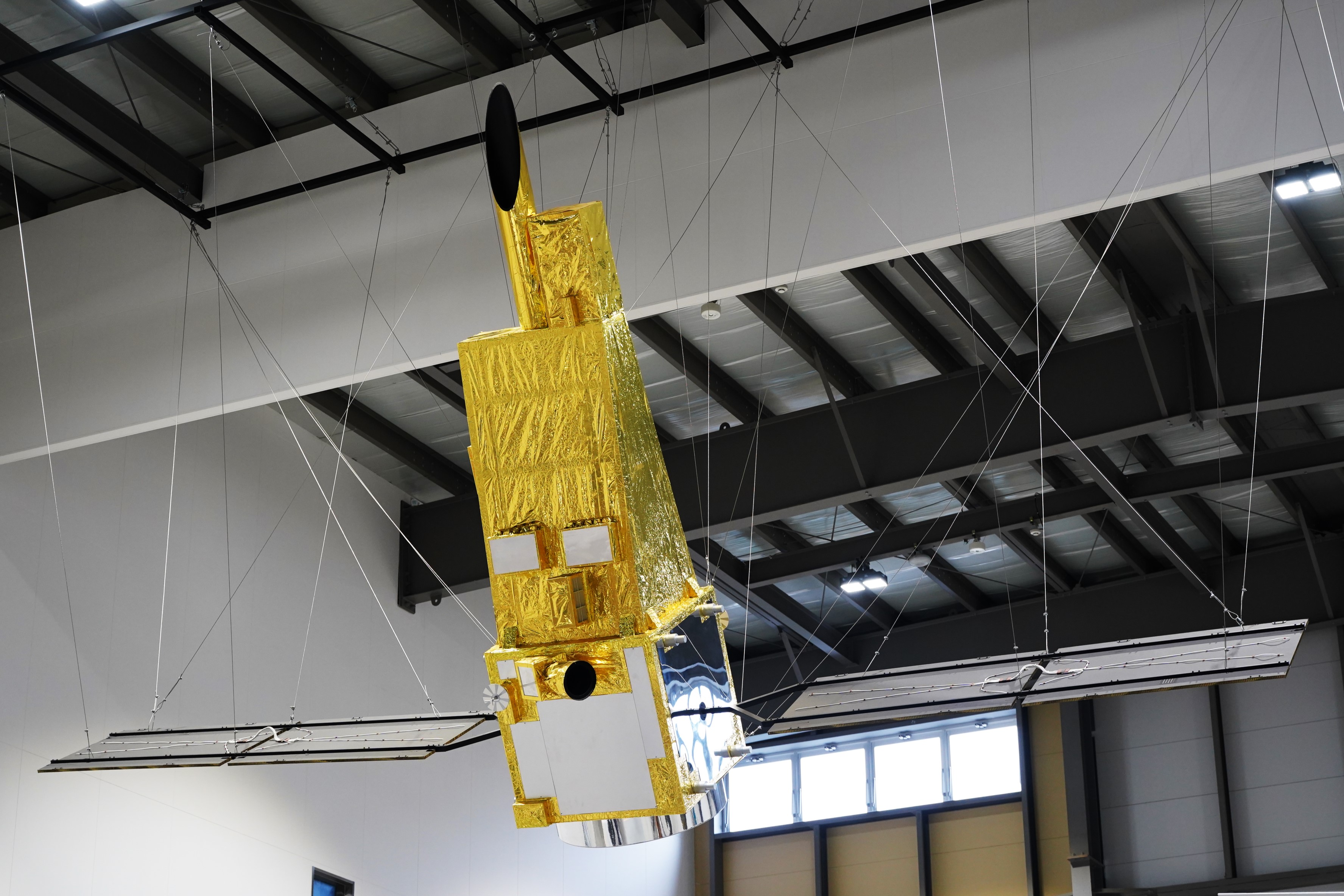
- Mission type: Ultraviolet astronomy
- Operator: JAXA
- COSPAR ID: 2013-049A
- SATCAT no.: 39253
- Website: www.jaxa.jp/projects/sat/sprint_a/
- Mission duration: ~1 year planned (science phase) 12 years, 5 months and 10 days (achieved)

Spacecraft properties
- Bus: NEXTAR NX-300L
- Manufacturer: NEC
- Launch mass: 348 kg (767 lb)
- Dimensions: 4×1×1 m (13.1×3.3×3.3 ft)
- Power: 900 watts

Start of mission
- Launch date: 14 September 2013, 05:00 UTC
- Rocket: Epsilon
- Launch site: Uchinoura

End of mission
- Disposal: Decommissioned
- Deactivated: 8 December 2023

Orbital parameters
- Reference system: Geocentric
- Regime: Low Earth
- Semi-major axis: 7,431.52 kilometres (4,617.73 mi)
- Eccentricity: 0.0136807
- Perigee altitude: 957.9 kilometres (595.2 mi)
- Apogee altitude: 1,161.8 kilometres (721.9 mi)
- Inclination: 29.72 degrees
- Period: 106.27 minutes
- Epoch: 23 January 2015, 18:21:14 UTC

Hisaki, also known as the Spectroscopic Planet Observatory for Recognition of Interaction of Atmosphere (SPRINT-A) was a Japanese ultraviolet astronomy satellite operated by the Japan Aerospace Exploration Agency (JAXA). The first mission of the Small Scientific Satellite program, it was launched in September 2013 on the maiden flight of the Epsilon rocket. It was used for extreme ultraviolet observations of the Solar System planets.

Hisaki was decommissioned by deactivation on 8 December 2023.

== Launch and naming ==
Hisaki was launched with an Epsilon rocket, which was its first flight. The four-stage Epsilon rocket flew from the Mu rocket launch complex at the Uchinoura Space Center. The launch occurred at 05:00 UTC on 14 September 2013, following a scrubbed launch attempt on 27 August 2013. Following its successful insertion into orbit and deployment of its solar arrays, the satellite was renamed Hisaki, having been designated SPRINT-A until that point.

Hisaki was named after a cape Hisaki (火崎, literally Cape Fire) used by local fishermen to pray for safe travels in the eastern part of Kimotsuki, Kagoshima near the Uchinoura Space Center, but has the additional meaning of "beyond the Sun". An old name for the mission was EXCEED (Extreme Ultraviolet Spectroscope for Exospheric Dynamics).

== Observations ==
Hisaki carries an extreme ultraviolet spectrometer, which is used to study the composition of the atmospheres and the behavior of the magnetospheres of the planets of the Solar System. Designed for a one-year mission, Hisaki was operated in a low Earth orbit with a perigee of 950 km (590 mi), an apogee of 1,150 km (710 mi), 31 degrees of inclination and a period of 106 minutes.

In 2016, Hisaki recorded dust storms on Mars altering the upper atmosphere.

In October 2020, it performed joint observation with the BepiColombo probe which performed a flyby of Venus en route to Mercury.

In 2023, Hisaki performed joint observations with Juno orbiter.

It was decommissioned on 8 December 2023 due to accuracy issues.
