= Ultraviolet astronomy =

Observation of electromagnetic radiation at ultraviolet wavelengths

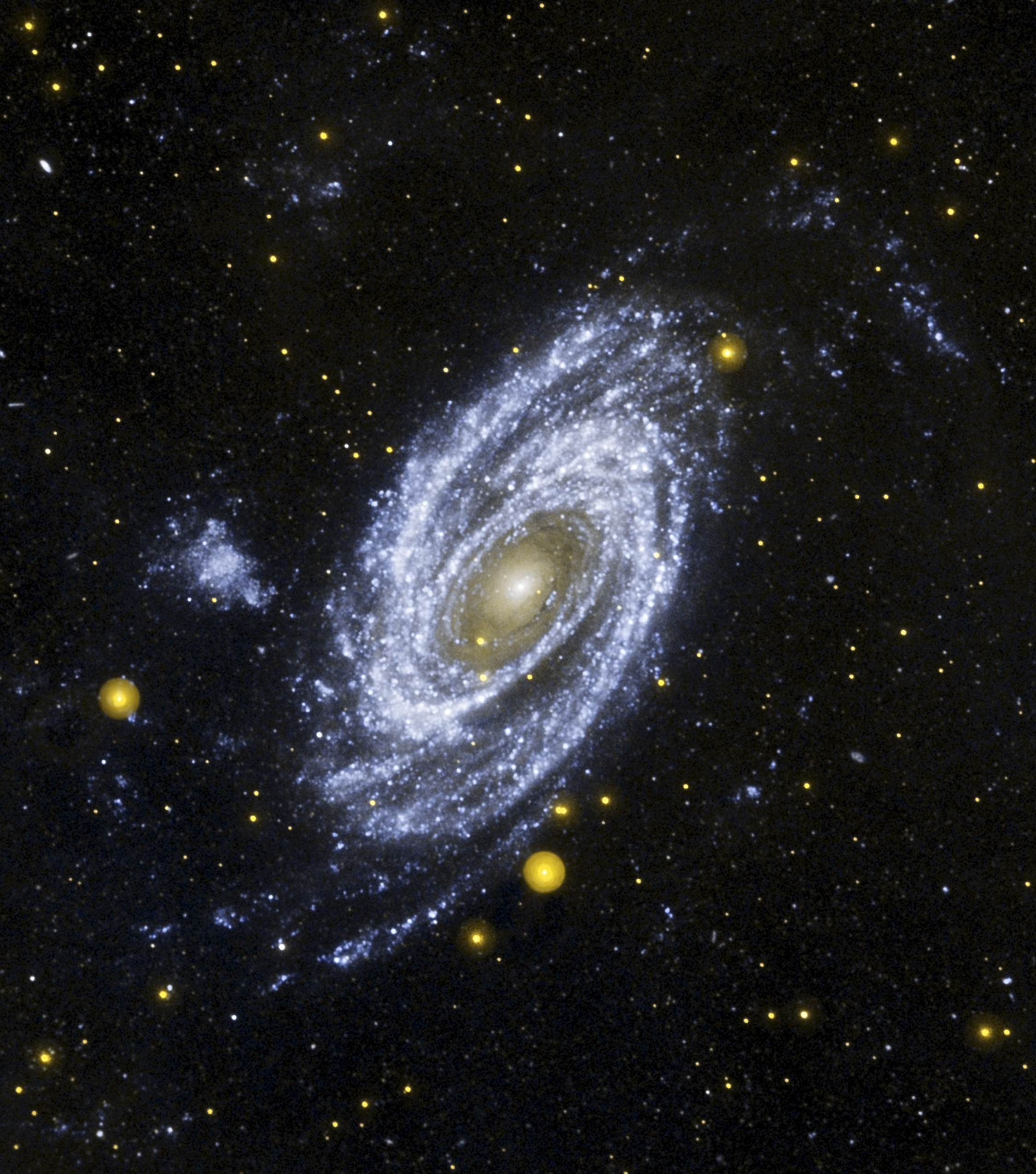
A GALEX image of the spiral galaxy Messier 81 in ultraviolet light. Credit:GALEX/NASA/JPL-Caltech.

Ultraviolet astronomy is the observation of electromagnetic radiation at ultraviolet wavelengths between approximately 10 and 320 nanometres; shorter wavelengths—higher energy photons—are studied by X-ray astronomy and gamma-ray astronomy. Ultraviolet light is not visible to the human eye. Most of the light at these wavelengths is absorbed by the Earth's atmosphere, so observations at these wavelengths must be performed from the upper atmosphere or from space.

== Overview ==
Ultraviolet line spectrum measurements (spectroscopy) are used to discern the chemical composition, densities, and temperatures of the interstellar medium, and the temperature and composition of hot young stars. UV observations can also provide essential information about the evolution of galaxies. They can be used to discern the presence of a hot white dwarf or main sequence companion in orbit around a cooler star.

The ultraviolet universe looks quite different from the familiar stars and galaxies seen in visible light. Most stars are actually relatively cool objects emitting much of their electromagnetic radiation in the visible or near-infrared part of the spectrum. Ultraviolet radiation is the signature of hotter objects, typically in the early and late stages of their evolution. In the Earth's sky seen in ultraviolet light, most stars would fade in prominence. Some very young massive stars and some very old stars and galaxies, growing hotter and producing higher-energy radiation near their birth or death, would be visible. Clouds of gas and dust would block the vision in many directions along the Milky Way.

Space-based solar observatories such as SDO and SOHO use ultraviolet telescopes (called AIA and EIT, respectively) to view activity on the Sun and its corona. Weather satellites such as the GOES-R series also carry telescopes for observing the Sun in ultraviolet.

The Hubble Space Telescope and FUSE have been the most recent major space telescopes to view the near and far UV spectrum of the sky, though other UV instruments have flown on smaller observatories such as GALEX, as well as sounding rockets and the Space Shuttle.

Pioneers in ultraviolet astronomy include George Robert Carruthers, Robert Wilson, and Charles Stuart Bowyer.

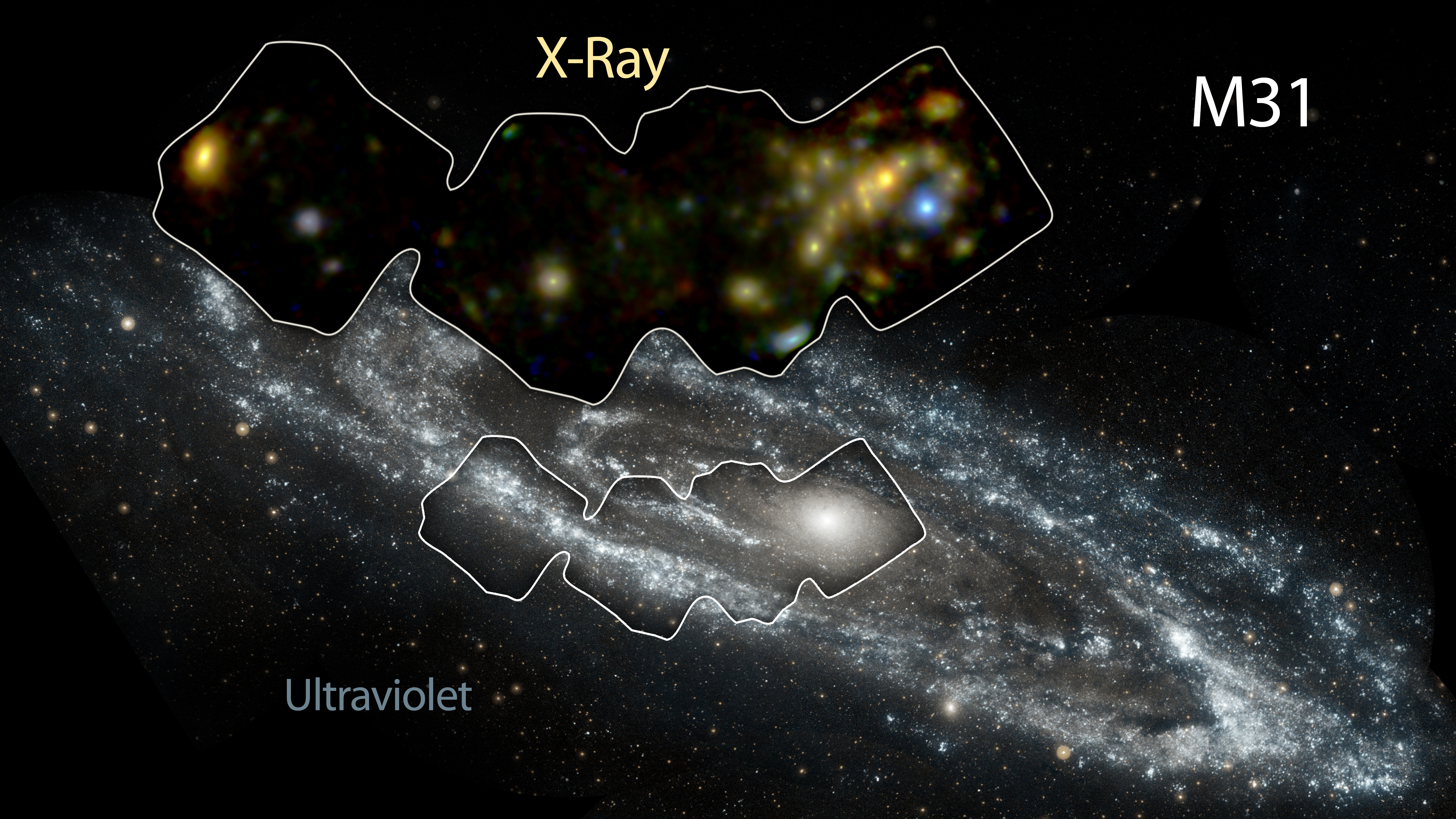
Andromeda Galaxy - in high-energy X-ray and ultraviolet light (released 5 January 2016).

== Ultraviolet space telescopes ==
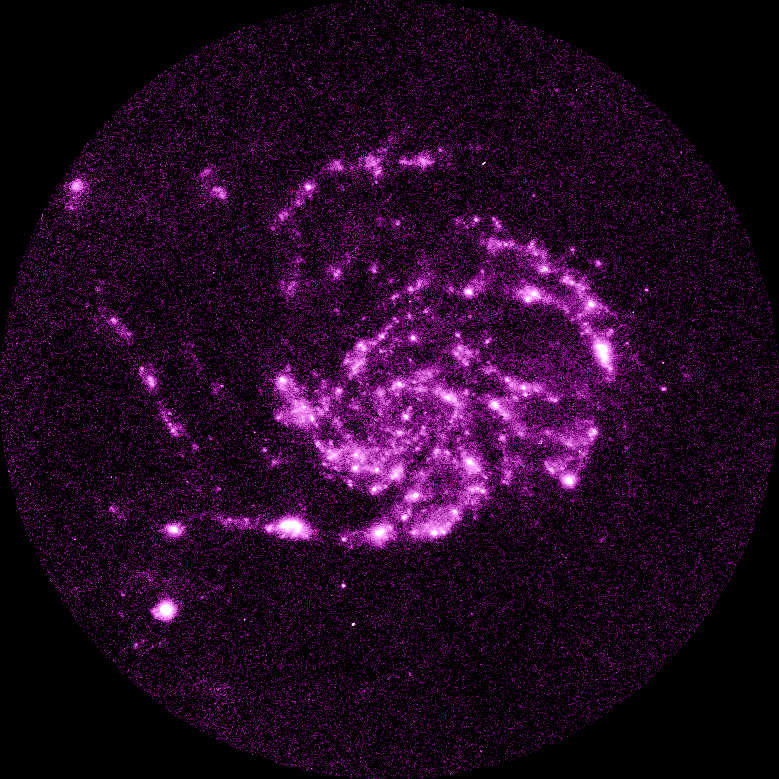
Astro 2 UIT captures M101 with ultraviolet shown in purple

- (United States) - Far Ultraviolet Camera/Spectrograph on Apollo 16 (April 1972)
- (United States) + ESRO - TD-1A (135-286 nm; 1972–1974)
- (United States) - Orbiting Astronomical Observatory (#2:1968-73. #3:1972-1981)
- (Soviet Union) - Orion 1 and Orion 2 Space Observatories (#1: 200-380 nm, 1971; #2: 200-300 nm, 1973)
- (United States) + - Astronomical Netherlands Satellite (150-330 nm, 1974–1976)
- (United States) + (European Union) - International Ultraviolet Explorer (115-320 nm, 1978–1996)
- (Soviet Union) - Astron-1 (150-350 nm, 1983–1989)
- (Soviet Union) - Glazar 1 and 2 on Mir (in Kvant-1, 1987–2001)
- (United States) - FAUST (140-180 nm, in ATLAS-1 Spacelab aboard STS-45 mission, March 1992)
- (United States) - EUVE (7-76 nm, 1992–2001)
- (United States) - FUSE (90.5-119.5 nm, 1999–2007)
- (United States) + (European Union) - Extreme ultraviolet Imaging Telescope (on SOHO imaging Sun at 17.1, 19.5, 28.4, and 30.4 nm)
- (United States) + (European Union) - Hubble Space Telescope (various 115-800 nm,1990-1997-) (STIS 115–1030 nm, 1997–) (WFC3 200-1700 nm, 2009–)
- (United States) - Swift Gamma-Ray Burst Mission (170–650 nm, 2004- )
- (United States) - Hopkins Ultraviolet Telescope (flew in 1990 and 1995)
- (Germany) - ROSAT XUV (17-210eV) (30-6 nm, 1990–1999)
- (United States) - Far Ultraviolet Spectroscopic Explorer (90.5-119.5 nm, 1999–2007)
- (United States) - Galaxy Evolution Explorer (135–280 nm, 2003–2012)
- (Japan) - Hisaki (130-530 nm, 2013 - 2023)
- (China) - Lunar-based ultraviolet telescope (LUT) (on Chang'e 3 lunar lander, 245-340 nm, 2013 -)
- (India) - Astrosat (130-530 nm, 2015 -)
- (United States) - Colorado Ultraviolet Transit Experiment - (255-330 nm spectrograph, 2021- )
- (European Union) - PROBA-3 (CUTE) - (530-588 nm coronagraph, 2024- )
- (Germany) - Public Telescope (PST) (100-180 nm, Proposed 2015, EU funded study )
- (United States) - Viewpoint-1 SpaceFab.US (200-950 nm, Launch planned 2022)
- (United States) - Carruthers Geocorona Observatory

See also List of ultraviolet space telescopes

== Ultraviolet instruments on planetary spacecraft ==
- (United States) - UVIS (Cassini) - 1997 of (at Saturn from 2004 to 2017)
- (United States) - MASCS (MESSENGER) - 2004 (at Mercury from 2011 to 2015)
- (United States) - Alice (New Horizons) - 2006 (Pluto flyby in 2015)
- (United States) - UVS (Juno) - 2011 (at Jupiter since 2016)
- (United States) - IUVS (MAVEN) - 2013 (at Mars since 2014)

== See also ==
- Markarian galaxies – Galaxy with a nucleus emitting exceptionally large amounts of ultraviolet
- Pea galaxy – Possible type of luminous blue compact galaxy
