= LEGRI =

Experiment payload for Minisat 1 satellite

The Low Energy Gamma-Ray Imager (LEGRI) was a payload for the first mission of the Spanish MINISAT platform, and active from 1997 to 2002. The objective of LEGRI was to demonstrate the viability of HgI_{2} detectors for space astronomy, providing imaging and spectroscopic capabilities in the 10-100 KeV range.

LEGRI was successfully launched on April 21, 1997, on a Pegasus XL rocket. The instrument was activated on May 19, 1997. It was active until February 2002.

The LEGRI system included the Detector Unit, Mask Unit, Power Supply, Digital Processing Unit, Star Sensor, and Ground Support Unit.

The LEGRI consortium included:

- University of Valencia
- University of Southampton
- University of Birmingham
- Rutherford Appleton Laboratory
- Centro de Investigaciones Energéticas
- Medioambientales y Tecnológicas (Ciemat)
- INTA
