= Far Ultraviolet Camera/Spectrograph =

Experiment deployed on the lunar surface

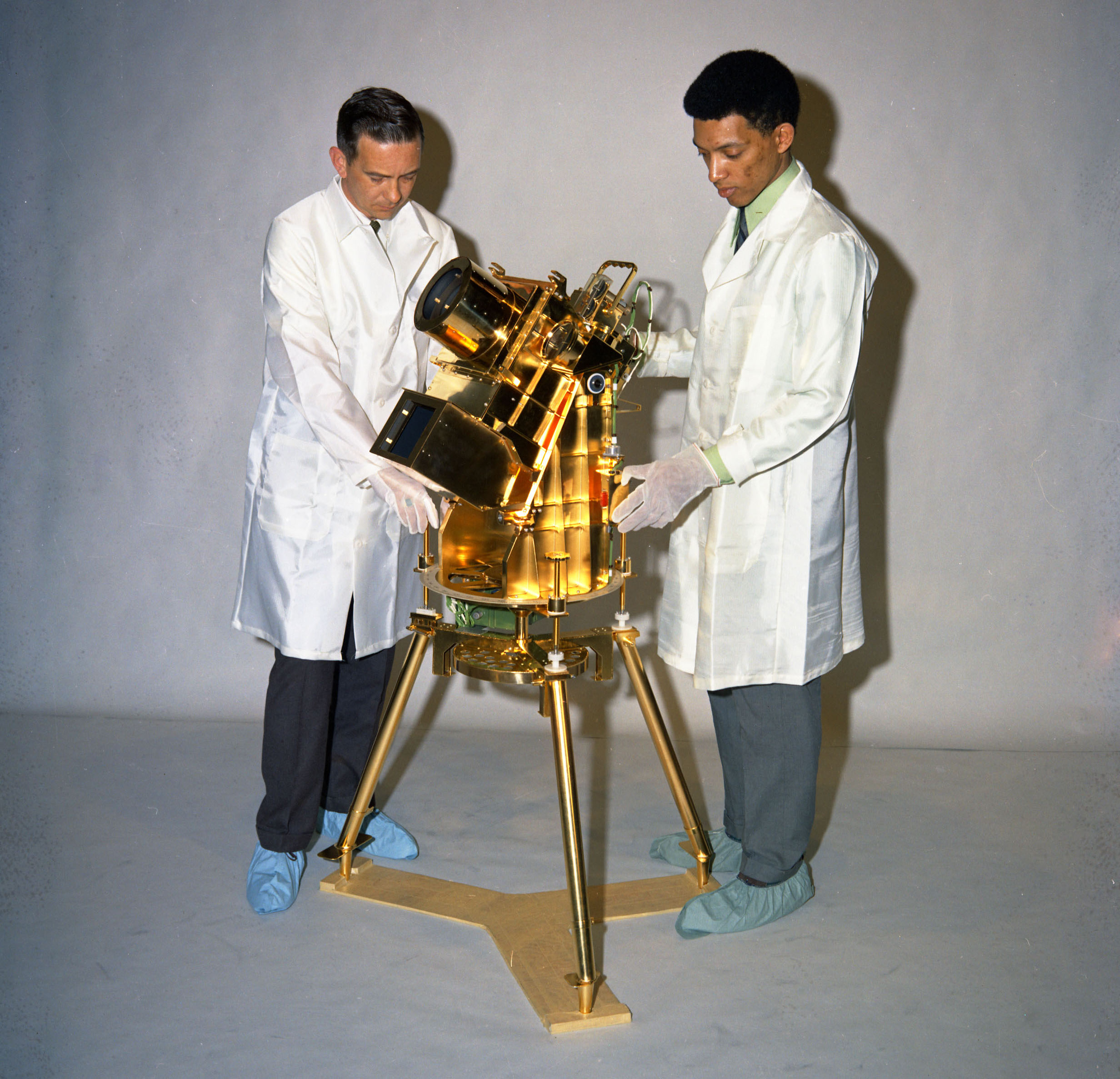
Dr. George Carruthers, right, and William Conway, a project manager at the Naval Research Institute, examine the gold-plated ultraviolet camera/spectrograph, the first moon-based observatory that Carruthers developed for the Apollo 16 mission.

The Far Ultraviolet Camera/Spectrograph (UVC) was one of the experiments deployed on the lunar surface by the Apollo 16 astronauts. It consisted of a telescope and camera that obtained astronomical images and spectra in the far ultraviolet region of the electromagnetic spectrum.

== Instrument ==
The Far Ultraviolet Camera/Spectrograph was a tripod mounted, f/1.0, 75 mm electronographic Schmidt camera weighing 22 kg. It had a 20° field of view in the imaging mode, and 0.5x20° field in the spectrographic mode. Spectroscopic data were provided from 300 to 1350 Ångström, with 30 Å resolution, and images were provided in two passbands ranges, 1050–1260 Å and 1200–1550 Å. There were two corrector plates made of lithium fluoride (LiF) or calcium fluoride (CaF_{2}), which could be selected for different bands of UV. The camera contained a cesium iodide (CsI) photocathode and used a film cartridge which was recovered and returned to earth for processing.

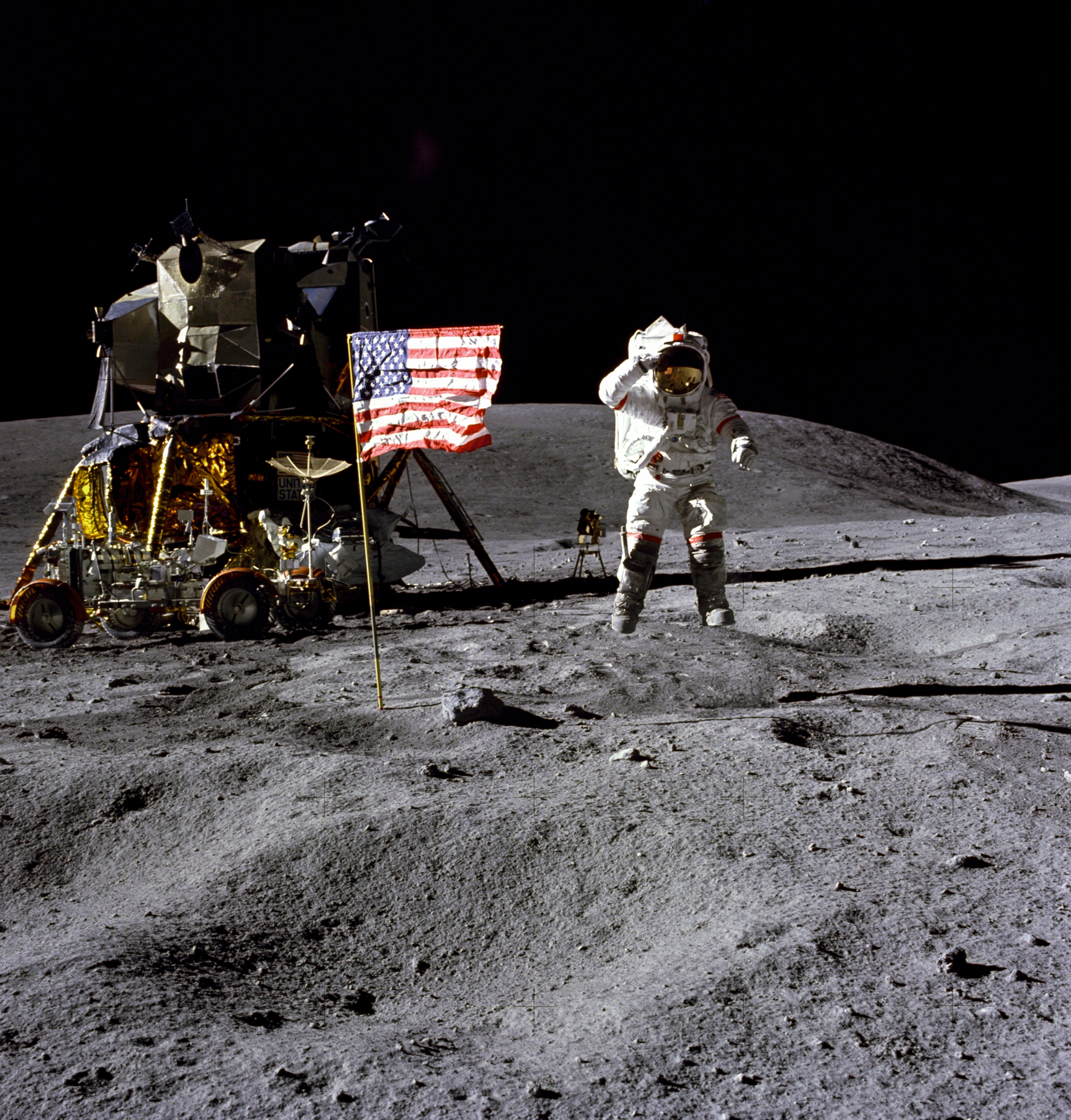
John Young saluting and jumping on the lunar surface. The Far UV Camera/Spectrograph can be seen in the background, under the shadow of the Apollo Lunar Module.

The experiment was placed on the Descartes Highlands region of lunar surface where Apollo 16 astronauts John Young and Charles Duke landed in April 1972. To keep it cool and eliminate solar glare, it was placed in the shadow of the Lunar Module. It was manually aimed by the astronauts, who would re-point the telescope at targets throughout the lunar stay.

== Experiment goals ==
The goals of the Far Ultraviolet Camera/Spectrograph spanned across several disciplines of astronomy. Earth studies were made by studying the Earth's upper atmosphere's composition and structure, the ionosphere, the geocorona, day and night airglow, and aurorae. Heliophysics studies were made by obtaining spectra and images of the solar wind, the solar bow cloud, and other gas clouds in the Solar System. Astronomical studies by obtaining direct evidence of intergalactic hydrogen, and spectra of distant galaxy clusters and within the Milky Way. Lunar studies were conducted by detecting gasses in the lunar atmosphere, and searching for possible volcanic gasses. There were also considerations to evaluate the lunar surface as a site for future astronomical observatories.

== Results ==
The film cartridge was removed during the third and final extravehicular activity, and returned to earth. The rest of the instrument package was left on the lunar surface. A total of 178 frames of film were obtained of 11 different targets including: the Earth's upper atmosphere and aurora, various nebulae and star clusters, and the Large Magellanic Cloud.

The film was digitally scanned and saved on tape. Files from these tapes can be requested at NASA. Most of the Apollo 16 and Skylab photos have been converted to JPGs by a third party enthusiast.

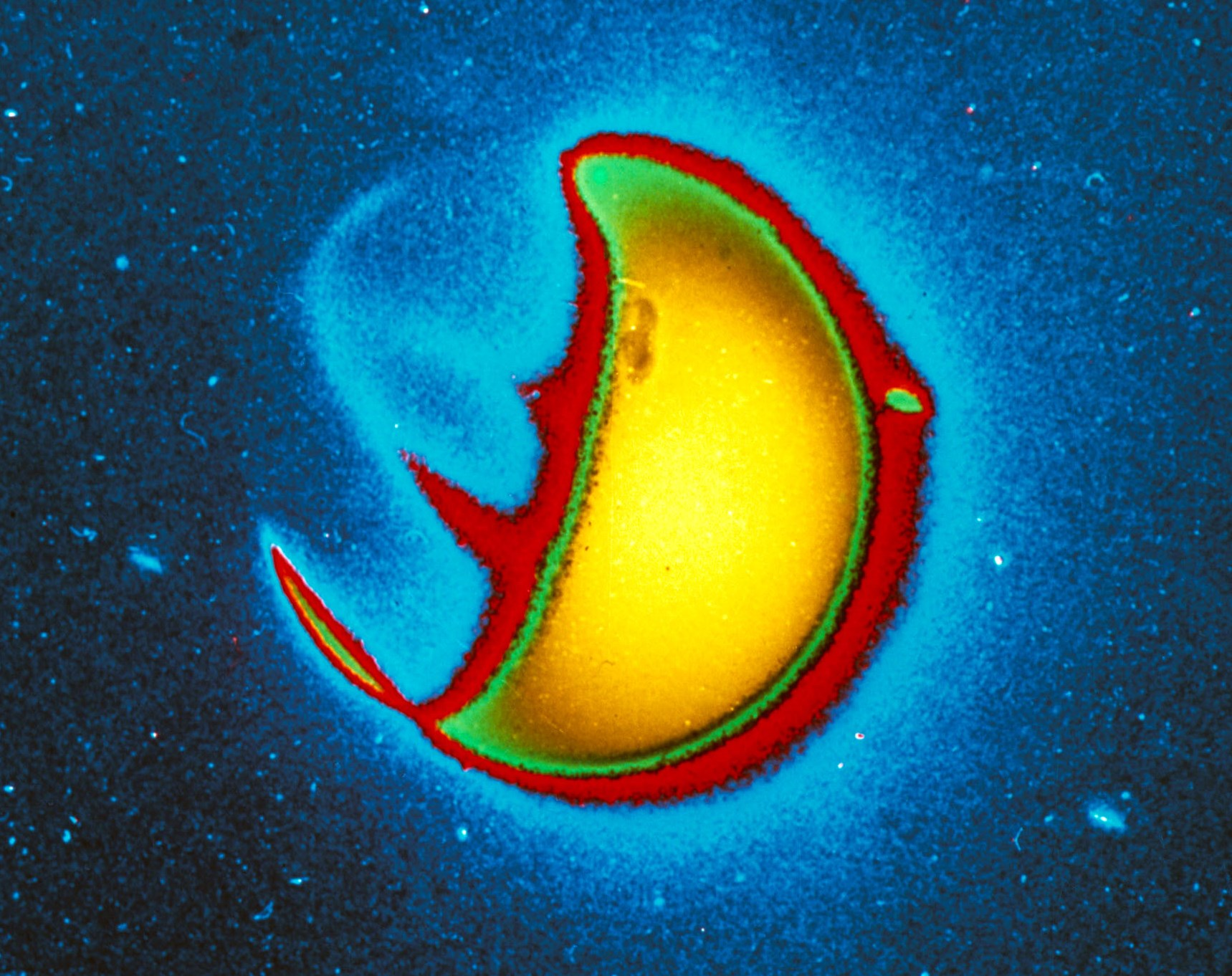
This is a picture of Earth in ultraviolet light, taken from the surface of the Moon. The day-side reflects a lot of UV light from the Sun, but the night-side shows bands of UV emission from the aurora caused by charged particles.

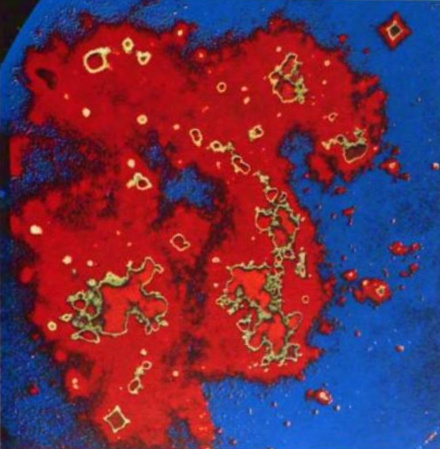
Color-enhanced UV photo of the Large Magellanic Cloud, taken from the lunar surface

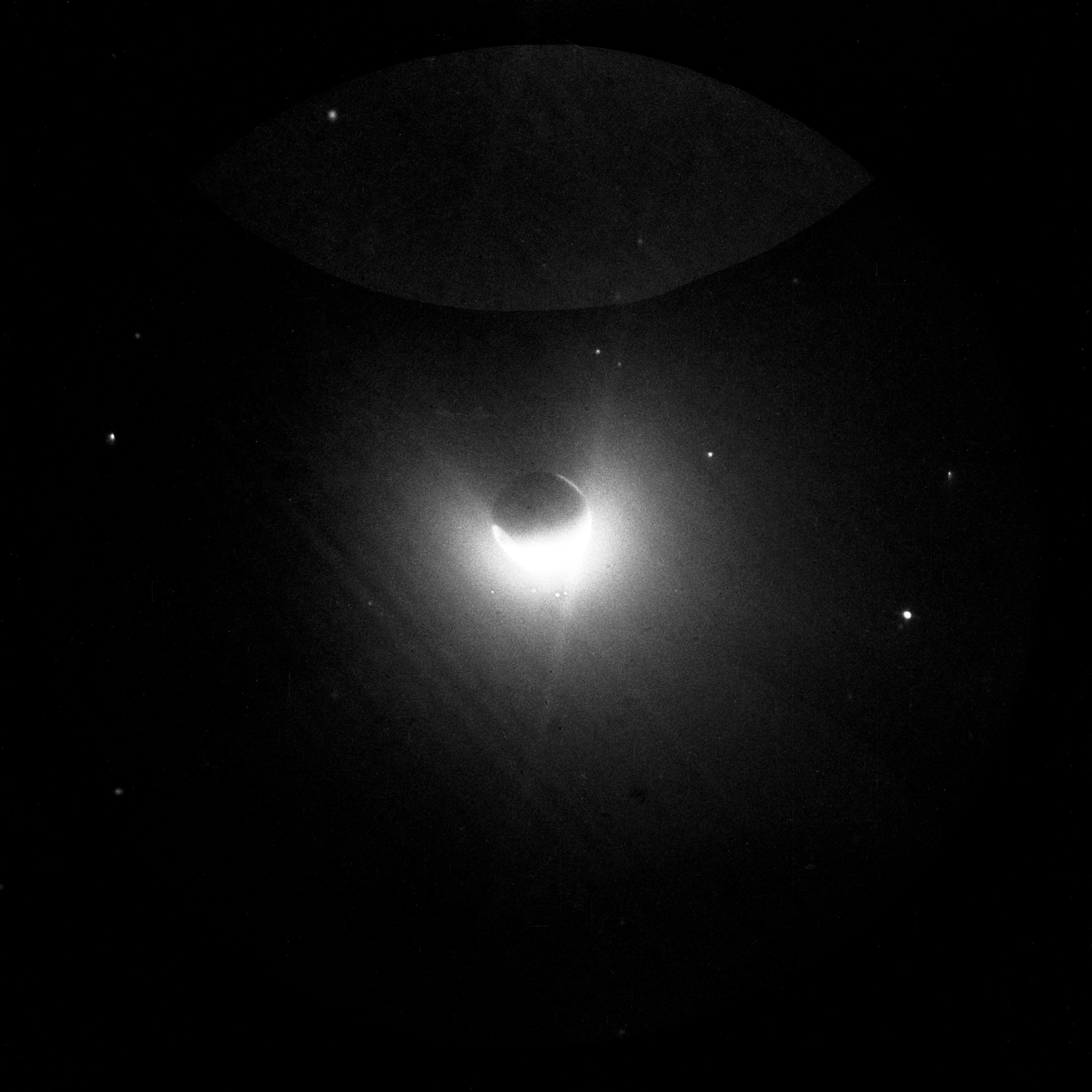
Earth's geocorona, as viewed by the Far Ultraviolet Camera/Spectrograph

== Designer ==
The principal investigator and chief engineer of the Far Ultraviolet Camera/Spectrograph was Dr. George Robert Carruthers, who was working at the US Naval Research Lab. In 1969, Dr. Carruthers was given a patent for "Image Converter for Detecting Electromagnetic Radiation Especially in Short Wave Lengths". For this and his further work, he received the 2012 National Medal of Technology and Innovation.

== Second telescope ==
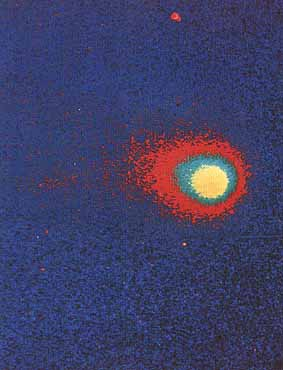
False color image of Comet Kohoutek photographed with the far-ultraviolet electrographic camera during a Skylab spacewalk on December 25, 1973.

A second spare telescope was slightly modified and later flown on Skylab 4. It was given an aluminum (Al) and magnesium fluoride (MgF_{2}) mirror rather than rhenium. It was mounted on Skylab's Apollo Telescope Mount for usage in orbit. Among the many images and spectra that it took, it was used to study ultraviolet emission from Comet Kohoutek.

== See also ==
- Apollo Program
- Ultraviolet astronomy
