= Institute for Laser Science =

Department of the University of Electro Communications, located near Tokyo, Japan

Coordinates: 35.6580°N 139.5413°E

The Institute for Laser Science is a department of the University of Electro Communications, located near Tokyo, Japan.

== History and achievements ==
Disk laser (active mirror).

Established in 1980, the Institute specializes mainly in improving the performance of gas lasers, especially excimer lasers. Between 1990 and 2005, the Institute developed fiber disk lasers, disk laser (active mirror) and the concept of power scaling. Ultra-low loss mirror was developed aiming application for high power lasers (1995).

Since 2000, its main research directions have been in the areas of solid state lasers, fiber lasers and ceramics. Since then, the Institute has carried out experiments with quantum reflection of cold excited neon atoms from silicon surfaces.

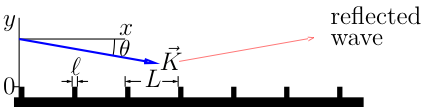
ridged atomic mirror

The institute has also performed the first experiments with quantum reflection of cold atoms from Si surface and, in particular, ridged mirrors for cold atoms and the interpretation as Zeno effect.

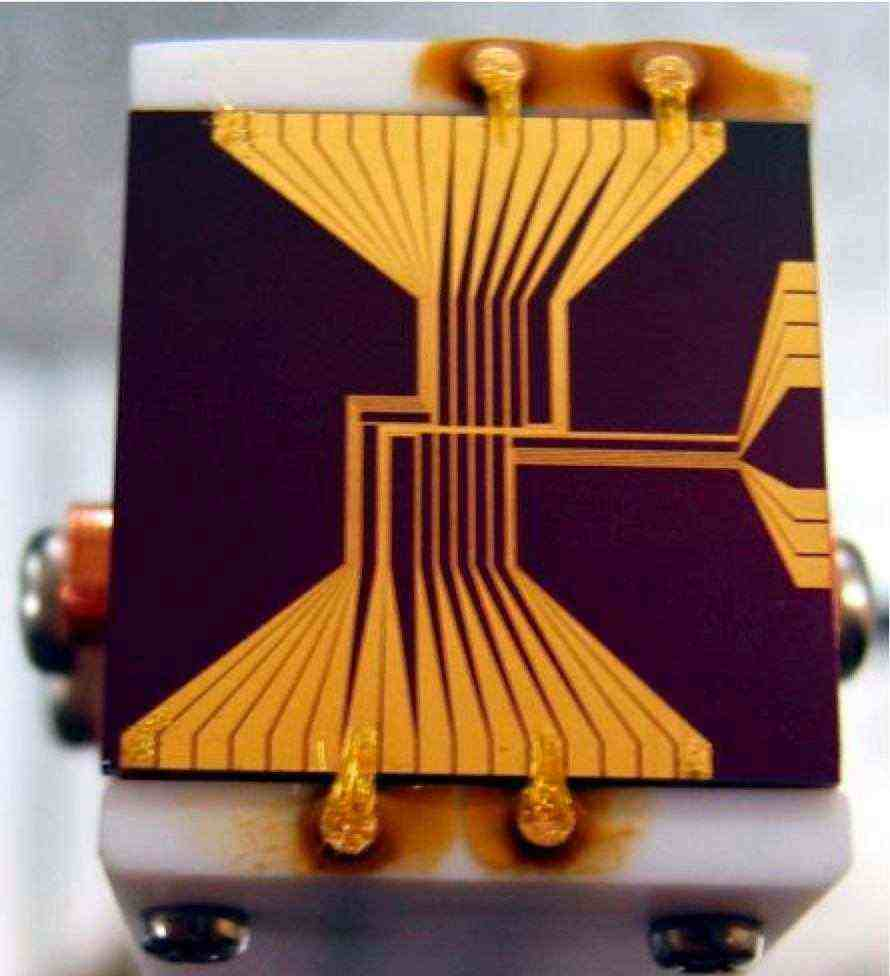
Microchip atomic trap

In 2004, the Institute developed the first microchip atomic trap.

== Current research ==
- Laser science, solid-state lasers http://wwwü.ils.uec.ac.jp/Essl.html,
  in particular, generation of very short pulses https://web.archive.org/web/20060225095710/http://www.ils.uec.ac.jp/Ehighintensity.html], fiber lasers
- Frequency stabilization, https://web.archive.org/web/19980110050941/http://www.ils.uec.ac.jp/Egravity.html
- Power scaling of disk lasers and limits for density of excitations in laser materials.
- Application of causality and McCumber relation in physics of laser materials.

Coherent addition of 4 fiber lasers

- Coherent addition of fiber lasers.
- Random lasers
- Self-pulsation and Q-switching.
- Generation and analysis of multi-charge ions, https://web.archive.org/web/20070626064459/http://www.ils.uec.ac.jp/EHCI.html,
- Ultra-cold atoms (cooling, trapping, Bose–Einstein condensate, atom optics and holography, quantum reflection and ridged mirrors.
- Trapping and fluorescence of atoms at nanowires
- Fundamentals of quantum mechanics with BEC.

== See also ==
- University of Electro-Communications (English version)
