= Scanning helium microscope =

Scanning helium microscope may refer to:

- Scanning helium microscopy
- Scanning Helium Ion Microscope
- Atomic nanoscope, which was proposed and discussed in the literature, but is not yet competitive with optical microscope, electron microscope, Scanning Helium Ion Microscope and various scanning probe microscopes
