= Jabez McClelland =

Physicist

Jabez Jenkins McClelland is an American physicist. He is best known for his work applying the techniques of laser cooling and atom optics to nanotechnology. This work involved expanding the number of atomic species that could be laser cooled from the alkalis and a few alkaline earth and noble gas species, to transition metals such a chromium and rare earths such as erbium. In the early 1990s he and colleagues showed that the nodes of an optical standing wave could act as lenses, focusing chromium atoms as they deposit onto a surface to create a permanent grating structure whose periodicity is precisely tied to an atomic resonance frequency, making it a useful nanoscale length standard. In the early 2000s his team showed that laser cooled atoms can produce a very high brightness ion beam when ionized just above threshold, and used this technique to realize a high resolution lithium ion microscope.

McClelland studied music and physics at Wesleyan University, and pursued graduate study in physics at the University of Texas at Austin. He was a postdoctoral researcher at the National Institute of Standards and Technology, and remained there full-time, successively heading the Electron Physics Group and Alternative Computing Group. McClelland was elected a fellow of the American Physical Society in 1998 "[f]or elucidation of spin polarized electron-atom interactions, and for pioneering development and application of atom optical methods in nanostructure fabrication." An equivalent honor bestowed by the Optical Society of America in 2004 acknowledged McClelland for his "contributions to atom optics, including the fabrication of stable structures by direct-write atomic lithography."
