= Sonja Franke-Arnold =

Scottish-German physicist

Sonja Franke-Arnold is a Scottish-German physicist specialising in quantum optics, atom optics, structured light, and the orbital angular momentum of light. She is a professor at the University of Glasgow, where she holds the Chair of Quantum Optics.

== Education and career ==
Franke-Arnold has a master's degree (MPhil) from the University of Strathclyde, received in 1994, after going to Strathclyde from the University of Hannover through the European Mobility Scheme for Physics Students of the European Physical Society. She went to Austria for doctoral study in physics at the University of Innsbruck, where she completed her doctorate (Dr rer nat) in 1998.

She returned to the University of Strathclyde as a postdoctoral research fellow and then Royal Society of Edinburgh Research Fellow from 1998 to 2005. In 2005 she moved to the University of Glasgow as a lecturer in physics and astronomy. She was promoted to reader in 2013 and professor in 2019. At the University of Glasgow, she has also been RCUK Roberts Research Fellow from 2005 to 2010, and Royal Society Dorothy Hodgkin Research Fellow since 2005. She chairs the International Network on Acausal Quantum Technologies of the University of Glasgow School of Physics & Astronomy.

== Recognition ==
Franke-Arnold was elected as a Fellow of the Institute of Physics (FInstP) in 2018. She was elected as a Fellow of the Royal Society of Edinburgh (FRSE) in 2024, and as an Optica Fellow, in the 2027 class of fellows.

== Personal life ==
Franke-Arnold is married to Aidan S. Arnold, a physicist from New Zealand who works as a reader in physics at the University of Strathclyde.
