= Kapitsa–Dirac effect =

Diffraction of matter by light

The Kapitza–Dirac effect is a quantum mechanical effect consisting of the diffraction of matter by a standing wave of light, in complete analogy to the diffraction of light by a periodic grating, but with the role of matter and light reversed. The effect was first predicted as the diffraction of electrons from a standing wave of light by Paul Dirac and Pyotr Kapitsa (or Peter Kapitza) in 1933. The effect relies on the wave–particle duality of matter as stated by the de Broglie hypothesis in 1924. The matter-wave diffraction by a standing wave of light was first observed using a beam of neutral atoms. Later, the Kapitza-Dirac effect as originally proposed was observed in 2001.

== Overview ==
In 1924, French physicist Louis de Broglie postulated that matter exhibits a wave-like nature given by:

$$\lambda = \frac h p,$$

where h is the Planck constant, and p is the particle's momentum, and λ is the wavelength of the matter wave. From this, it follows that interference effects between particles of matter will occur. This forms the basis of the Kapitza–Dirac effec: the diffraction of matter wave due to a standing wave of light.

A coherent beam of light will diffract into several peaks once it passes through a periodic diffraction grating. Due to matter-wave duality, the matter can be diffracted by a periodic diffraction grating as well. Such a diffraction grating can be made out of physical matter, but can also be created by a standing wave of light formed by a pair of counterpropagating light beams, due to light–matter interaction. Here, the standing wave of light forms the spatially periodic grating that will diffract the matter wave, as we will now explain.

The original idea proposes that a beam of electron can be diffracted by a standing wave formed by a superposition of two counterpropagating beams of light. The diffraction is caused by light–matter interaction. In this case, each electron absorbs a photon from one of the beams, and re-emits a photon into the other beam traveling to the opposite direction. This describes a stimulated Compton scattering of photons by the electrons, since the re-emission here is stimulated by the presence of a second beam of light. Due to the nature of the stimulated Compton scattering, the re-emitted photon must carry the same frequency and opposite direction of the absorbed one. Consequently, the momentum transferred to the electron must have a magnitude of $2\hbar k$ where $k$ is the wavevector of the light forming the standing wave pattern.

Although the original proposal focused on electrons, the above analysis can be generalized to other types of matter waves that interacts with the light. Cold neutral atoms, for example, can also experience the Kapitza-Dirac effect. Indeed, one of the first observations of Kapitza-Dirac effect was using a beams of cold sodium atoms. Today, the Kapitza-Dirac effect is a standard tool to calibrate the depth of optical lattices which are formed by standing waves of light.

=== Different regimes of diffraction ===
Diffraction from a periodic grating, regardless of electromagnetic or matter wave, can be roughly divided into two regimes: the Bragg regime and Raman-Nath regime. In the Bragg regime, essentially only one diffraction peak is produced. In the Raman-Nath regime, multiple diffraction peaks can be observed.

It is helpful to go back to the familiar example of light diffraction from a matter grating. In this case, The Bragg regime is reached with a thick grating, whereas the Raman-Nath regime is obtained with a thin grating. The same language can be applied to Kapitza-Dirac effect. Here, the concept of "thickness" of the grating can be transferred to the amount of time the matter wave spent in the light field.

Here we give an example in the Raman-Nath regime, where the matter spends an amount of time in the standing wave that is short compared to the so-called recoil frequency of the particle. This approximation holds if the interaction time is less than the inverse of the recoil frequency of the particle, $\tau\ll 1/\omega_\text{rec}$ where $\omega_\text{rec} = \frac{\hbar k^2}{2m}$.

A coherent beam of particles incident on a standing wave of electromagnetic radiation (typically light) will be diffracted according to the equation:

$$n\lambda = 2d\sin\Theta,$$

where n is an integer, λ is the de Broglie wavelength of the incident particles, d is the spacing of the grating and θ is the angle of incidence.

== Diffraction pattern in the Raman-Nath regime ==
Here we present an analysis of the diffraction pattern of the Kapitza-Dirac effect in the Raman-Nath regime For a matter wave interacting in a standing wave of light, the effect of the light–matter interaction can be parametrized by the potential energy

$U(z,t)= U_0 f(t) \sin^2(kz),$

where $U_0$ is the strength of the potential energy, and $f(t)$ describes the pulse shape of applied standing wave. For example, for ultracold atoms trapped in an optical lattice, $U_0 = \frac{\hbar \omega^2_\text{R}}{\delta}$ due to the AC Stark shift.

As described previously, the Raman-Nath regime is reached when the duration is short. In this case, the kinetic energy can be ignored and the resulting Schrödinger equation is greatly simplified. For a given initial state $\left|\psi_0\right\rangle$, the time-evolution within the Raman-Nath regime is then given by

$\left|\psi\right\rangle = \left|\psi_0\right\rangle e^{-\frac{i}{\hbar} \int dt'U(z,t')} = \left|\psi_0\right\rangle e^{-\frac{i}{2\delta}\omega^2_\text{R}\tau} e^{\frac{i}{2\delta}\omega^2_\text{R}\tau\cos(2kz)},$ where $\tau=\int dt'f^2(t')$ and the integral is over the duration of the interaction. Using the Jacobi–Anger expansion for Bessel functions of the first kind, $e^{i\alpha\cos(\beta)} = \sum^\infty_{n=-\infty}i^n J_n(\alpha)e^{in\beta}$, the above wavefunction becomes

$$\begin{align}
\left|\psi\right\rangle & = \left|\psi_0\right\rangle e^{-\frac i {2\delta} \omega^2_\text{R}\tau} \sum^\infty_{n=-\infty}i^nJ_n \left( \frac{\omega^2_\text{R}}{2\delta}\tau\right) e^{i2nkz} \\
& = e^{-\frac i {2\delta}\omega^2_\text{R}\tau} \sum^\infty_{n=-\infty} i^n J_n\left( \frac{\omega^2_\text{R}}{2\delta}\tau\right) \left|g,2n\hbar k\right\rangle
\end{align}$$

where in the second line $|\psi_0\rangle$ has been taken to be $|g,0\rangle$. It can now be seen that $2n\hbar k$ momentum states are populated with a probability of $P_n = J^2_n(\theta)$ where $n = 0,\pm 1, \pm 2, \ldots$ and the pulse area (duration and amplitude of the interaction) $\theta = \frac{\omega^2_\text{R}}{2\delta}\tau = \omega^{(2)}_\text{R}\tau$. The transverse RMS momentum of the diffracted particles is therefore linearly proportional to the pulse area:
$$p_\text{rms} = \sum^\infty_{n=-\infty} (n\hbar k)^2 P_n = \sqrt{2}\theta\hbar k.$$

== Realisation ==
The invention of the laser in 1960 allowed the production of coherent light and therefore the ability to construct the standing waves of light that are required to observe the effect experimentally. Kapitsa–Dirac scattering of sodium atoms by a near resonant standing wave laser field was experimentally demonstrated in 1985 by the group of D. E. Pritchard at the Massachusetts Institute of Technology. A supersonic atomic beam with sub-recoil transverse momentum was passed through a near resonant standing wave and diffraction up to 10ħk was observed. The scattering of electrons by an intense optical standing wave was experimentally realised by the group of M. Bashkansky at AT&T Bell Laboratories, New Jersey, in 1988.

The Kapitza-Dirac effect is routinely used in calibration of the depth of the optical lattices.
