= Atom optics =

Techniques to exploit wave properties of atoms

Atom optics (or atomic optics) "refers to techniques to manipulate the trajectories and exploit the wave properties of neutral atoms". Typical experiments employ beams of cold, slowly moving neutral atoms, as a special case of a particle beam. Like an optical beam, the atomic beam may exhibit diffraction and interference, and can be focused with a Fresnel zone plate or a concave atomic mirror.

For comprehensive overviews of atom optics, see the 1994 review by Adams, Sigel, and Mlynek or the 2009 review by Cronin, Jörg, and Pritchard. More bibliography about Atom Optics can be found in the 2017 Resource Letter in the American Journal of Physics. For quantum atom optics see the 2018 review by Pezzè et al.

== History ==
Interference of atom matter waves was first observed by Esterman and Stern in 1930, when a Na beam was diffracted off a surface of NaCl. The short de Broglie wavelength of atoms prevented progress for many years until two technological breakthroughs revived interest: microlithography allowing precise small devices and laser cooling allowing atoms to be slowed, increasing their de Broglie wavelength.

Until 2006, the resolution of imaging systems based on atomic beams was not better than that of an optical microscope, mainly due to the poor performance of the focusing elements. Such elements use small numerical aperture; usually, atomic mirrors use grazing incidence, and the reflectivity drops drastically with increase of the grazing angle; for efficient normal reflection, atoms should be ultracold, and dealing with such atoms usually involves magnetic, magneto-optical or optical traps.

At the beginning of the 21st century scientific publications about "atom nano-optics", evanescent field lenses and ridged mirrors showed significant improvement. In particular, an atomic hologram can be realized.

== See also ==
- Atom interferometer
- Atomic nanoscope
- Electron microscope
- Quantum reflection
