= Matter wave clock =

A matter wave clock is a type of clock whose principle of operation makes use of the apparent wavelike properties of matter.

Matter waves were first proposed by Louis de Broglie and are sometimes called de Broglie waves. They form a key aspect of wave–particle duality and experiments have since supported the idea. The wave associated with a particle of a given mass, such as an atom, has a defined frequency, and a change in the duration of one cycle from peak to peak that is sometimes called its Compton periodicity. Such a matter wave has the characteristics of a simple clock, in that it marks out fixed and equal intervals of time. The twins paradox arising from Albert Einstein's theory of relativity means that a moving particle will have a slightly different period from a stationary particle. Comparing two such particles allows the construction of a practical "Compton clock".

== Matter waves as clocks ==
De Broglie proposed that the frequency f of a matter wave equals E/h, where E is the total energy of the particle and h is the Planck constant. For a particle at rest, the relativistic equation E=mc^{2} allows the derivation of the Compton frequency f for a stationary massive particle, equal to mc^{2}/h.

De Broglie also proposed that the wavelength λ for a moving particle was equal to h/p where p is the particle's momentum.

The period (one cycle of the wave) is equal to 1/f.

This precise Compton periodicity of a matter wave is said to be the necessary condition for a clock, with the implication that any such matter particle may be regarded as a fundamental clock. This proposal has been referred to as "A rock is a clock."

=== Applications ===
In his paper, "Quantum mechanics, matter waves and moving clocks", Müller has suggested that "The description of matter waves as matter-wave clocks ... has recently been applied to tests of general relativity, matter-wave experiments, the foundations of quantum mechanics, quantum space-time decoherence, the matter wave clock/mass standard, and led to a discussion on the role of the proper time in quantum mechanics. It is generally covariant and thus well-suited for use in curved space-time, e.g., gravitational waves."

=== Implications ===
In his paper, "Quantum mechanics, matter waves and moving clocks", Müller has suggested that "[The model] has also given rise to a fair amount of controversy. Within the broader context of quantum mechanics ... this description has been abandoned, in part because it could not be used to derive a relativistic quantum theory, or explain spin. The descriptions that replaced the clock picture achieve these goals, but do not motivate the concepts used. ... We shall construct a ... description of matter waves as clocks. We will thus arrive at a space-time path integral that is equivalent to the Dirac equation. This derivation shows that De Broglie's matter wave theory naturally leads to particles with spin-1/2. It relates to Feynman's search for a formula for the amplitude of a path in 3+1 space and time dimensions which is equivalent to the Dirac equation. It yields a new intuitive interpretation of the propagation of a Dirac particle and reproduces all results of standard quantum mechanics, including those supposedly at odds with it. Thus, it illuminates the role of the gravitational redshift and the proper time in quantum mechanics."

=== Controversy ===
The theoretical idea of matter waves as clocks has caused some controversy, and has attracted strong criticism.

== Atom interferometry ==
An atom interferometer uses a small difference in waves associated with two atoms to create an observable interference pattern. Conventionally these waves are associated with the electrons orbiting the atom, but the matter wave theory suggests that the wave associated with the wave–particle duality of the atom itself may alternatively be used.

An experimental device comprises two clouds of atoms, one of which is given a small "kick" from a precisely-tuned laser. This gives it a finite velocity which, according to the matter wave theory lowers its observed frequency. The two clouds are then recombined so that their differing waves interfere, and the maximum output signal is obtained when the frequency difference is an integer number of cycles.

Experiments designed around the idea of interference between matter waves (as clocks) are claimed to have provided the most accurate validation yet of the gravitational redshift predicted by general relativity. A similar atom interferometer forms the heart of the Compton clock.

However, this claimed interpretation of the interferometry function has been criticised. One criticism is that a real Compton oscillator or matter wave does not appear in the design of any actual experiment. The matter wave interpretation is also said to be flawed.

== Compton clocks ==
A functional timepiece designed on the basis of matter wave interferometry is called a Compton clock.

=== Principles of operation ===
The frequency of the wave associated with a massive particle, such as an atom, is too high to be used directly in a practical clock and its period and wavelength are too short. A practical device makes use of the twin paradox arising from the theory of relativity, where a moving particle ages more slowly than a stationary one. The moving particle-wave therefore has a slightly lower frequency. Using interferometry, the difference or "beat frequency" between the two frequencies can be accurately measured and this beat frequency can be used as a basis for keeping time.

== Measurement of mass ==
The technique used in the devices can theoretically be reversed to use time to measure mass. This has been proposed as an opportunity for replacing the platinum-iridium cylinder currently used as the 1 kg reference standard.
