= Plane of incidence =

Plane containing the surface normal and the propagation vector of the incoming radiation

The plane of incidence is defined by the incoming radiation's propagation vector and the normal vector of the surface.

In describing reflection and refraction in optics, the plane of incidence (also called the incidence plane or the meridional plane) is the plane which contains the surface normal and the propagation vector of the incoming radiation. (In wave optics, the latter is the k-vector, or wavevector, of the incoming wave.)

When reflection is specular, as it is for a mirror or other shiny surface, the reflected ray also lies in the plane of incidence; when refraction also occurs, the refracted ray lies in the same plane. The condition of co-planarity among incident ray, surface normal, and reflected ray (refracted ray) is known as the first law of reflection (first law of refraction, respectively).

== Polarizations ==
The orientation of the incident light's polarization with respect to the plane of incidence has an important effect on the strength of the reflection. P-polarized light is incident linearly polarized light with polarization direction lying in the plane of incidence. S-polarized light has polarization perpendicular to the plane of incidence. The s in s-polarized comes from the German word senkrecht, meaning perpendicular. The strength of reflection from a surface is determined by the Fresnel equations, which are different for s- and p-polarized light.

== See also ==
- Angle of incidence (optics)
- Plane of polarization
- Vertical plane
