= Fiber disk laser =

Fiber laser with transverse delivery of the pump light

A fiber disk laser is a fiber laser with transverse delivery of the pump light. They are characterized by the pump beam not being parallel to the active core of the optical fiber (as in a double-clad fiber), but directed to the coil of the fiber at an angle (usually, between 10 and 40 degrees). This allows use of the specific shape of the pump beam emitted by the laser diode, providing the efficient use of the pump.

== Realizations of fiber disk lasers ==
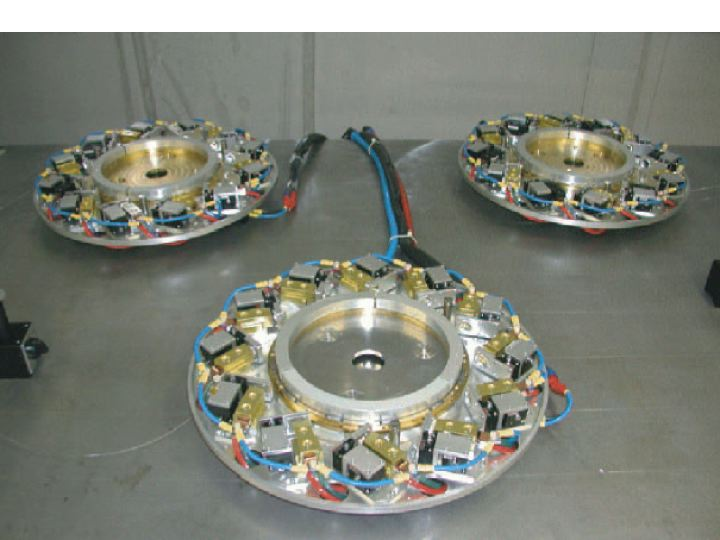
3 fiber disk lasers

The first disk lasers were developed in the Institute for Laser Science, Japan. Several realizations of fiber disk lasers were reported. The fiber disk laser is so named because the fiber is tightly coiled. Typically, no special feedback for the laser frequency is required, as the small reflection at end of the fiber is sufficient to provide efficient operation. In this case, both ends of the coiled fiber can be used as output.

== Application and power scaling ==
Fiber disk lasers are used for cutting of metal (up to few mm thick), welding and folding. The disk-shaped configuration allows efficient heat dissipation (usually, the disks are cooled with flowing water), allowing power scaling. When the increase of the length of the fiber becomes limited by stimulated scattering, additional power scaling can be achieved by combining several fiber disk lasers into a stack.

The spiral-coiled configuration is not the only possible arrangement; any other scheme of stacking of optical fibers with lateral delivery of pump can also be called a fiber disk laser, even if the resulting shape of the device is not circular. The term fiber disk laser applies to the concept of lateral delivery of pump to the active optical fiber rather than specifically to a disk-shaped device. The optimal shape of the fiber disk laser may depend on the properties of the beam of pump available, as well as on the specific application.
