= Atomic mirror =

Device reflecting neutral atoms

In physics, an atomic mirror is a device which reflects neutral atoms in a way similar to the way a conventional mirror reflects visible light. Atomic mirrors can be made of electric fields or magnetic fields, electromagnetic waves or just silicon wafer; in the last case, atoms are reflected by the attracting tails of the van der Waals attraction (see quantum reflection). Such reflection is efficient when the normal component of the wavenumber of the atoms is small or comparable to the effective depth of the attraction potential (roughly, the distance at which the potential becomes comparable to the kinetic energy of the atom). To reduce the normal component, most atomic mirrors are blazed at the grazing incidence.

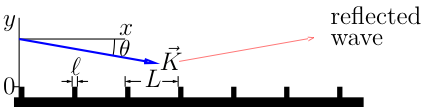
Ridged mirror. The wave with wavevector $~\vec K~$ is scattered at ridges separated by distance $~L~$

At grazing incidence, the efficiency of the quantum reflection can be enhanced by a surface covered with ridges (ridged mirror).

The set of narrow ridges reduces the van der Waals attraction of atoms to the surfaces and enhances the reflection. Each ridge blocks part of the wavefront, causing Fresnel diffraction.

Such a mirror can be interpreted in terms of the Zeno effect. We may assume that the atom is "absorbed" or "measured" at the ridges. Frequent measuring (narrowly spaced ridges) suppresses the transition of the particle to the half-space with absorbers, causing specular reflection. At large separation $~L~$ between thin ridges, the reflectivity of the ridged mirror is determined by dimensionless momentum $~p=\sqrt{KL~}~\theta~$, and does not depend on the origin of the wave; therefore, it is suitable for reflection of atoms.

== Applications ==
- Atomic interferometry

== See also ==
- Quantum reflection
- Ridged mirror
- Zeno effect
- Atomic nanoscope
- Atom laser
