= Ridged mirror =

In atomic physics, a ridged mirror (or ridged atomic mirror, or Fresnel diffraction mirror) is a kind of atomic mirror, designed for the specular reflection of neutral particles (atoms) coming at a grazing incidence angle. In order to reduce the mean attraction of particles to the surface and increase the reflectivity, this surface has narrow ridges.

== Reflectivity of ridged atomic mirrors ==
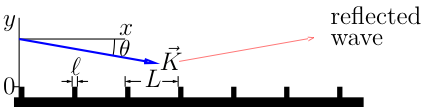

Various estimates for the efficiency of quantum reflection of waves from ridged mirror were discussed in the literature. All the estimates explicitly use the de Broglie theory about wave properties of reflected atoms.

=== Scaling of the van der Waals force ===
The ridges enhance the quantum reflection from the surface, reducing the effective constant $~C~$ of the van der Waals attraction of atoms to the surface. Such interpretation leads to the estimate of the reflectivity

$$\displaystyle r \approx r_0\!\left( \frac \ell L C,\!~K\sin(\theta)\right)$$,

where $~\ell~$ is width of the ridges, $~L~$ is distance between ridges, $\displaystyle ~\theta~$ is grazing angle, and $~K=mV/\hbar~$ is wavenumber and $~r_0(C,k)~$ is coefficient of reflection of atoms with wavenumber $~k~$ from a flat surface at the normal incidence. Such estimate predicts the enhancement of the reflectivity at the increase of period $~L~$; this estimate is valid at $KL\!~\theta^2\ll 1$. See quantum reflection for the approximation (fit) of the function $~r_0~$.

=== Interpretation as Zeno effect ===
For narrow ridges with large period $L$, the ridges just blocks the part of the wavefront. Then, it can be interpreted in terms of the Fresnel diffraction of the de Broglie wave, or the Zeno effect; such interpretation leads to the estimate the reflectivity

$$~\displaystyle r \approx \exp\!\left(-\sqrt{8\!~K\!~L}~\theta\right)~$$,

where the grazing angle $\displaystyle ~\theta~$ is supposed to be small. This estimate predicts enhancement of the reflectivity at the reduction of period $~L~$. This estimate requires that $~\ell/L \ll 1~$.

=== Fundamental limit ===
For efficient ridged mirrors, both estimates above should predict high reflectivity. This implies reduction of both, width, $\ell$ of the ridges and the period, $L$. The width of the ridges cannot be smaller than the size of an atom; this sets the limit of performance of the ridged mirrors.

== Applications of ridged mirrors ==
Ridged mirrors are not yet commercialized, although certain achievements can be mentioned. The reflectivity of a ridged atomic mirror can be orders of magnitude better than that of a flat surface. The use of a ridged mirror as an atomic hologram has been demonstrated. In Shimizu's and Fujita's work, atom holography is achieved via electrodes implanted into SiN_{4} film over an atomic mirror, or maybe as the atomic mirror itself.

Ridged mirrors can also reflect visible light; however, for light waves, the performance is not better than that of a flat surface. An ellipsoidal ridged mirror is proposed as the focusing element for an atomic optical system with submicrometre resolution (atomic nanoscope).

== See also ==
- Atomic mirror
- Quantum reflection
- Atomic nanoscope
- Zeno effect
- Matter wave
