= Scanning helium ion microscope =

Imaging instrument using a helium ion beam

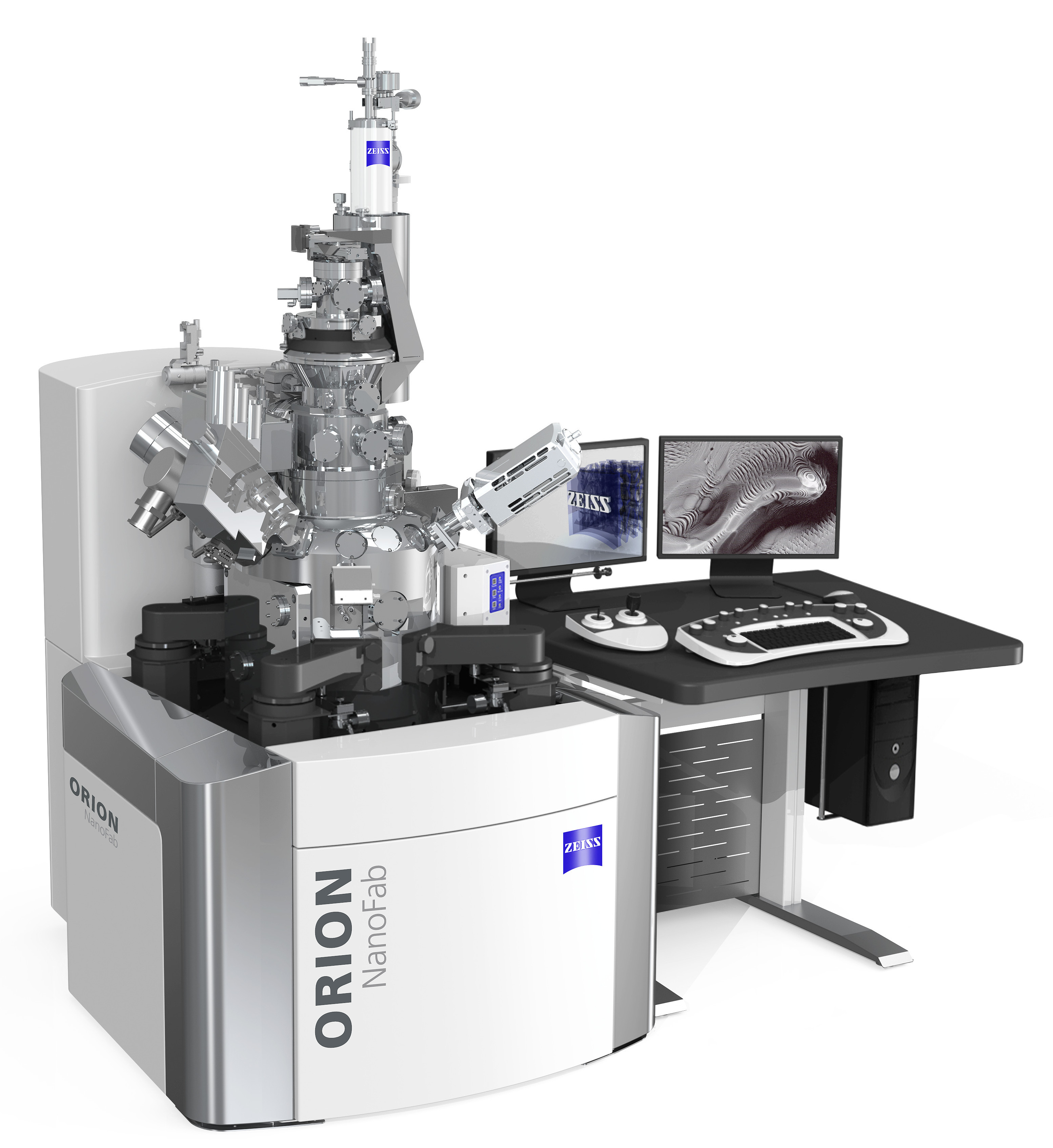
Helium ion microscope by Zeiss

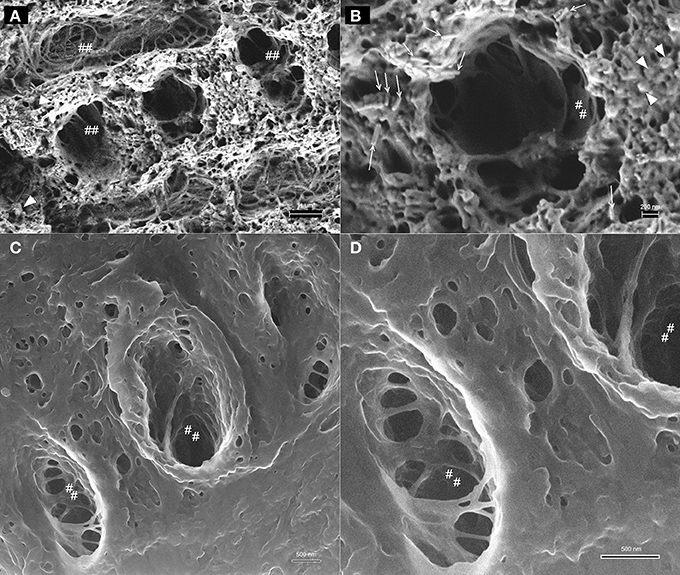
Comparison of SEM (top) and SHIM (bottom) images of mouse enamel. SHIM images have a superior depth of field, showing internal structure in enamel tunnels, which are dark spots in SEM images.

A scanning helium ion microscope (SHIM, HeIM or HIM) is a high-resolution imaging instrument that uses a scanning helium ion beam to visualize at sub-nanometer resolution. It was developed in the mid-2000s for nanotechnology applications, and has been demonstrated to have a better surface resolution than scanning electron microscopes.

== Description ==
Scanning helium ion microscope (SHIM) was developed in the mid-2000s as a new microscopy technique for nanotechnology applications. It uses a focused beam of helium ions to scan a specimen's surface instead of electrons used in a scanning electron microscope (SEM). It utilizes a gas field ionization source (GFIS), which is used to produce a highly focused beam of helium ions.

The very high source brightness, and the short De Broglie wavelength of the helium ions, enables extremely small probe sizes. Similar to other focused ion beam techniques, it allows to combine milling and cutting of samples with their observation at sub-nanometer resolution. A surface resolution of 0.24 nanometers has been demonstrated by Zeiss.

When the helium ions interact with a sample under visualization, it does not suffer from large excitation volume, and hence produces a much smaller interaction volume compared to electrons, leading to better surface sensitivity. These characteristics enable the SHIM to obtain qualitative data with a greater resolution that is not achievable with conventional microscopes which use photons or electrons as the emitting source. The small interaction volume results in high contrast images, with a large depth of field on a wide range of materials. The microscope is also better at imaging insulating materials because it causes less charging on interaction with such materials compared to electron beams.

== History ==
The SHIMs were made commercially available by Zeiss in 2007, and the first microscope was shipped to the National Institute of Standards and Technology. However, it was discontinued by Zeiss in 2023.
