= Quantum Zeno effect =

Quantum measurement phenomenon

With the increasing number of measurements the wave function tends to stay in its initial form. In the animation, a free time evolution of a wave function, depicted on the left, is in the central part interrupted by occasional position measurements that localize the wave function in one of nine sectors. On the right, a series of very frequent measurements leads to the quantum Zeno effect.

In quantum mechanics, frequent measurements cause the quantum Zeno effect, a reduction in transitions away from the system's initial state, slowing a system's time evolution.

Sometimes this effect is interpreted as "a system cannot change while you are watching it". One can "freeze" the evolution of the system by measuring it frequently enough in its known initial state. The meaning of the term has since expanded, leading to a more technical definition, in which time evolution can be suppressed not only by measurement: the quantum Zeno effect is the suppression of unitary time evolution in quantum systems provided by a variety of sources: measurement, interactions with the environment, stochastic fields, among other factors. As an outgrowth of study of the quantum Zeno effect, it has become clear that applying a series of sufficiently strong and fast pulses with appropriate symmetry can also decouple a system from its decohering environment.

The name comes by analogy to Zeno's arrow paradox, which states that because an arrow in flight is not seen to move during any single instant, it cannot possibly be moving at all. In the quantum Zeno effect an unstable state seems frozen – to not 'move' – due to a constant series of observations. The comparison is due to a 1977 article by Baidyanath Misra and E. C. George Sudarshan.

According to the reduction postulate, each measurement causes the wavefunction to collapse to an eigenstate of the measurement basis. In the context of this effect, an observation can simply be the absorption of a particle, without the need of an observer in any conventional sense. However, there is controversy over the interpretation of the effect, sometimes referred to as the "measurement problem" in traversing the interface between microscopic and macroscopic objects.

Another crucial problem related to the effect is strictly connected to the time–energy indeterminacy relation (part of the indeterminacy principle). If one wants to make the measurement process more and more frequent, one has to correspondingly decrease the time duration of the measurement itself. But the request that the measurement last only a very short time implies that the energy spread of the state in which reduction occurs becomes increasingly large. However, the deviations from the exponential decay law for small times is crucially related to the inverse of the energy spread, so that the region in which the deviations are appreciable shrinks when one makes the measurement process duration shorter and shorter. An explicit evaluation of these two competing requests shows that it is inappropriate, without taking into account this basic fact, to deal with the actual occurrence and emergence of Zeno's effect.

Closely related (and sometimes not distinguished from the quantum Zeno effect) is the watchdog effect, in which the time evolution of a system is affected by its continuous coupling to the environment.

== Description ==
Unstable quantum systems are predicted to exhibit a short-time deviation from the exponential decay law. This universal phenomenon has led to the prediction that frequent measurements during this nonexponential period could inhibit decay of the system, one form of the quantum Zeno effect. Subsequently, it was predicted that measurements applied more slowly could also enhance decay rates, a phenomenon known as the quantum anti-Zeno effect.

In quantum mechanics the interaction mentioned is called "measurement" because its result can be interpreted in terms of classical mechanics. Frequent measurement prohibits the transition. It can be a transition of a particle from one half-space to another (which could be used for an atomic mirror in an atomic nanoscope) as in the time-of-arrival problem, a transition of a photon in a waveguide from one mode to another, and it can be a transition of an atom from one quantum state to another. It can be a transition from the subspace without decoherent loss of a qubit to a state with a qubit lost in a quantum computer. In this sense, for the qubit correction, it is sufficient to determine whether the decoherence has already occurred or not. All these can be considered as applications of the Zeno effect. By its nature, the effect appears only in systems with distinguishable quantum states, and hence is inapplicable to classical phenomena and macroscopic bodies.

The idea is implicit in John von Neumann's early work Mathematical Foundations of Quantum Mechanics, and in particular the rule sometimes called the reduction postulate. It was later shown that the quantum Zeno effect of a single system is equivalent to the indetermination of the quantum state of a single system.

== History ==
The unusual nature of the short-time evolution of quantum systems and the consequences for measurement was noted by John von Neumann in his Mathematical Foundations of Quantum Mechanics, published in 1932. This aspect of quantum mechanics lay unexplored until 1967 when Beskow and Nilsson suggested that the mathematics indicated that an unstable particle in a bubble chamber would not decay. In 1977, Baidyanath Misra and E. C. George Sudarshan presented a mathematical analysis of this quantum effect and proposed its association with Zeno's arrow paradox. This paradox of Zeno of Elea imagines seeing an flying arrow at any fixed instant: it is immobile, frozen in the space it occupies.

Despite continued theoretical work, experimental confirmation did not appear until 1990 when Itano et al. applied the idea proposed by Cook to study oscillating systems rather than unstable ones. Itano drove a transition between two levels in trapped ^{9}Be^{+} ions while simultaneously measuring absorption of laser pulses proportional to population of the lower level.

== Various realizations and general definition ==
The treatment of the Zeno effect as a paradox is not limited to the processes of quantum decay. In general, the term Zeno effect is applied to various transitions, and sometimes these transitions may be very different from a mere "decay" (whether exponential or non-exponential).

One realization refers to the observation of an object (Zeno's arrow, or any quantum particle) as it leaves some region of space. In the 20th century, the trapping (confinement) of a particle in some region by its observation outside the region was considered as nonsensical, indicating some non-completeness of quantum mechanics. Even as late as 2001, confinement by absorption was considered as a paradox. Later, similar effects of the suppression of Raman scattering was considered an expected effect, not a paradox at all. The absorption of a photon at some wavelength, the release of a photon (for example one that has escaped from some mode of a fiber), or even the relaxation of a particle as it enters some region, are all processes that can be interpreted as measurement. Such a measurement suppresses the transition, and is called the Zeno effect in the scientific literature.

In order to cover all of these phenomena (including the original effect of suppression of quantum decay), the Zeno effect can be defined as a class of phenomena in which some transition is suppressed by an interaction – one that allows the interpretation of the resulting state in the terms 'transition did not yet happen' and 'transition has already occurred', or 'The proposition that the evolution of a quantum system is halted' if the state of the system is continuously measured by a macroscopic device to check whether the system is still in its initial state.

== Periodic measurement of a quantum system ==
Consider a system in a state $A$, which is the eigenstate of some measurement operator. Say the system under free time evolution will decay with a certain probability into state $B$. If measurements are made periodically, with some finite interval between each one, at each measurement, the wave function collapses to an eigenstate of the measurement operator. Between the measurements, the system evolves away from this eigenstate into a superposition state of the states $A$ and $B$. When the superposition state is measured, it will again collapse, either back into state $A$ as in the first measurement, or away into state $B$. However, its probability of collapsing into state $B$ after a very short amount of time $t$ is proportional to $t^2$, since probabilities are proportional to squared amplitudes, and amplitudes behave linearly. Thus, in the limit of a large number of short intervals, with a measurement at the end of every interval, the probability of making the transition to $B$ goes to zero.

According to decoherence theory, measurement of a system is not a one-way "collapse" but an interaction with its surrounding environment, which in particular includes the measurement apparatus. A measurement is equivalent to correlating or coupling the quantum state to the apparatus state in such a way as to register the measured information. If this leaves it still able to decohere further to a different state perhaps due to the noisy thermal environment, this state may last only for a brief period of time; the probability of decaying increases with time. Then frequent measurement reestablishes or strengthens the coupling, and with it the measured state, if frequent enough for the probability to remain low. The time it expectedly takes to decay is related to the expected decoherence time of the system when coupled to the environment. The stronger the coupling is, and the shorter the decoherence time, the faster it will decay. So in the decoherence picture, an "ideal" quantum Zeno effect corresponds to the mathematical limit where a quantum system is continuously coupled to the environment, and where that coupling is infinitely strong, and where the "environment" is an infinitely large source of thermal randomness.

== Experiments and discussion ==
Experimentally, strong suppression of the evolution of a quantum system due to environmental coupling has been observed in a number of microscopic systems.

In 1989, David J. Wineland and his group at NIST observed the quantum Zeno effect for a two-level atomic system that was interrogated during its evolution. Approximately 5,000 ^{9}Be^{+} ions were stored in a cylindrical Penning trap and laser-cooled to below 250 mK. A resonant RF pulse was applied, which, if applied alone, would cause the entire ground-state population to migrate into an excited state. After the pulse was applied, the ions were monitored for photons emitted due to relaxation. The ion trap was then regularly "measured" by applying a sequence of ultraviolet pulses during the RF pulse. As expected, the ultraviolet pulses suppressed the evolution of the system into the excited state. The results were in good agreement with theoretical models.

In 2001, Mark G. Raizen and his group at the University of Texas at Austin observed the quantum Zeno effect for an unstable quantum system, as originally proposed by Sudarshan and Misra. They also observed an anti-Zeno effect. Ultracold sodium atoms were trapped in an accelerating optical lattice, and the loss due to tunneling was measured. The evolution was interrupted by reducing the acceleration, thereby stopping quantum tunneling. The group observed suppression or enhancement of the decay rate, depending on the regime of measurement.

In 2015, Mukund Vengalattore and his group at Cornell University demonstrated a quantum Zeno effect as the modulation of the rate of quantum tunnelling in an ultracold lattice gas by the intensity of light used to image the atoms.

In 2024, Björn Annby-Andersson and his colleagues from Lund University in their experiment with a system of two quantum dots with one electron came to the conclusion that "As the measurement strength is further increased, the Zeno effect prohibits interdot tunneling. A Zeno-like effect is also observed for weak measurements, where measurement errors lead to fluctuations in the on-site energies, dephasing the system." https://journals.aps.org/prresearch/abstract/10.1103/PhysRevResearch.6.043216

The quantum Zeno effect is used in commercial atomic magnetometers and proposed to be part of birds' magnetic compass sensory mechanism (magnetoreception).

It is still an open question how closely one can approach the limit of an infinite number of interrogations due to the Heisenberg uncertainty involved in shorter measurement times. It has been shown, however, that measurements performed at a finite frequency can yield arbitrarily strong Zeno effects. In 2006, Streed et al. at MIT observed the dependence of the Zeno effect on measurement pulse characteristics.

The interpretation of experiments in terms of the "Zeno effect" helps describe the origin of a phenomenon. Nevertheless, such an interpretation does not bring any principally new features not described with the Schrödinger equation of the quantum system.

Even more, the detailed description of experiments with the "Zeno effect", especially at the limit of high frequency of measurements (high efficiency of suppression of transition, or high reflectivity of a ridged mirror) usually do not behave as expected for an idealized measurement.

It was shown that the quantum Zeno effect persists in the many-worlds and relative-states interpretations of quantum mechanics.

== See also ==
- Einselection
- Interference (wave propagation)
- Measurement problem
- Observer effect (physics)
- Quantum Darwinism
- Quantum decoherence
- Wavefunction collapse
- Zeno's paradoxes
