= Atomic beam =

Type of particle beam

Atomic beam is special case of particle beam; it is the collimated flux (beam) of neutral atoms. The imaging systems using the slow atomic beams can use the Fresnel zone plate (Fresnel diffraction lens) of a Fresnel diffraction mirror as focusing element. The imaging system with atomic beam could provide the sub-micrometre resolution.

== History ==
In 1911, Louis Dunoyer observed sodium vapor 'rays' in a vacuum chamber. Learning from that experience, Otto Stern worked with Walther Gerlach to produce silver atom beams for their historic Stern–Gerlach experiment, providing the first evidence of atomic scale quantization.

In 1930, Immanuel Estermann and Stern reflected a helium beam from lithium fluoride observing the first atomic matter wave diffraction peaks in the reflected intensity.
