= Magnetic trap (atoms) =

Use of magnetic fields to isolate particles or atoms

In experimental physics, a magnetic trap is an apparatus which uses a magnetic field gradient to trap neutral particles with magnetic moments. Although such traps have been employed for many purposes in physics research, they are best known as the last stage in cooling atoms to achieve Bose–Einstein condensation. The magnetic trap (as a way of trapping very cold atoms) was first proposed by David E. Pritchard.

== Operating principle ==
Many atoms have a magnetic moment; their energy shifts in a magnetic field according to the formula

$$\Delta E = - \vec{\mu} \cdot \vec{B}$$.

According to the principles of quantum mechanics the magnetic moment of an atom will be quantized; that is, it will take on one of certain discrete values. If the atom is placed in a strong magnetic field, its magnetic moment will be aligned with the field. If a number of atoms are placed in the same field, they will be distributed over the various allowed values of magnetic quantum number for that atom.

If a magnetic field gradient is superimposed on the uniform field, those atoms whose magnetic moments are aligned with the field will have lower energies in a higher field. Like a ball rolling down a hill, these atoms will tend to occupy locations with higher fields and are known as "high-field-seeking" atoms. Conversely, those atoms with magnetic moments aligned opposite the field will have higher energies in a higher field, tend to occupy locations with lower fields, and are called "low-field-seeking" atoms.

It is impossible to produce a local maximum of the magnetic-field magnitude in free space; however, a local minimum may be produced. This minimum can trap atoms which are low-field-seeking if they do not have enough kinetic energy to escape the minimum. Typically, magnetic traps have relatively shallow field minima and are only able to trap atoms whose kinetic energies correspond to temperatures of a fraction of a kelvin. The field minima required for magnetic trapping can be produced in a variety of ways. These include permanent magnet traps, Ioffe configuration traps, QUIC traps and others.

== Microchip atom trap ==
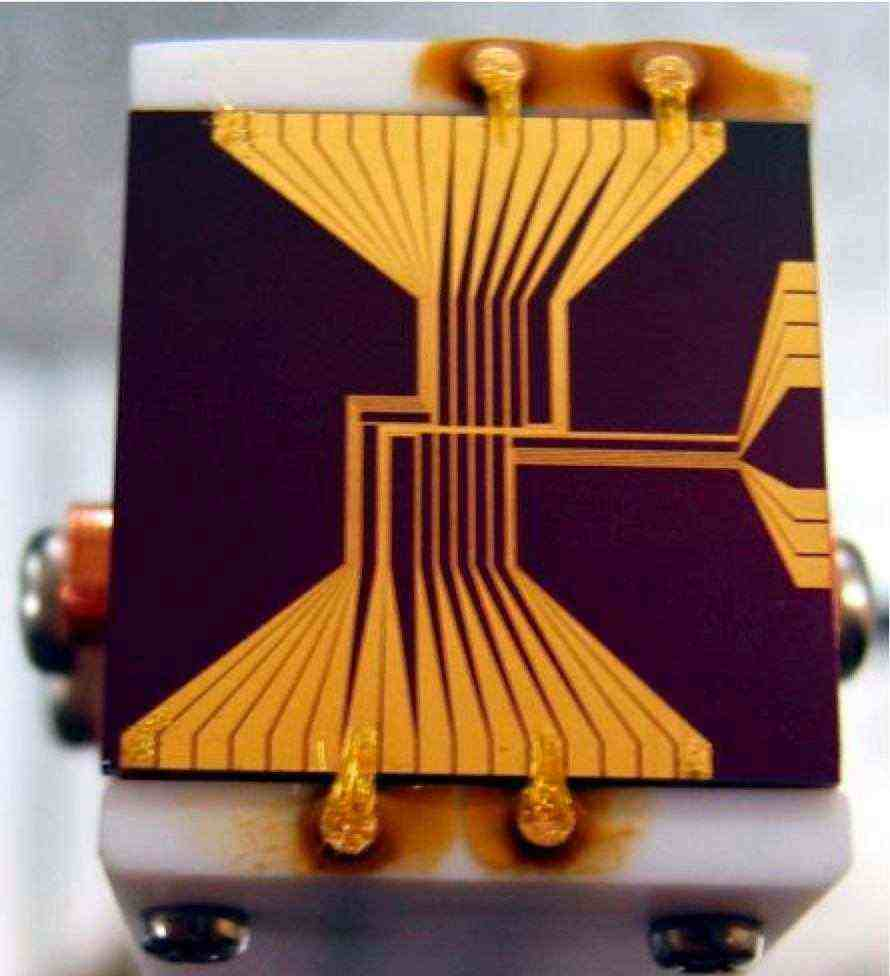
Microchip atomic trap developed in ILS in 2005

The minimum magnitude of the magnetic field can be realized with the "atom microchip". One of the first microchip atomic traps is shown on the right. The Z-shaped conductor (actually the golden Z-shaped strip painted on the Si surface) is placed into the uniform magnetic field (the field's source is not shown in the figure). Only atoms with positive spin-field energy were trapped. To prevent the mixing of spin states, the external magnetic field was inclined in the plane of the chip, providing the adiabatic rotation of the spin at the movement of the atom. In the first approximation, magnitude (but not orientation) of the magnetic field is responsible for effective energy of the trapped atom. The chip shown is 2 cm x 2 cm; this size was chosen for ease in manufacture. In principle, the size of such microchip traps can be drastically reduced. An array of such traps can be manufactured with conventional lithographic methods; such an array is considered a prototype of a qubit memory cell for the quantum computer. Ways of transferring atoms and/or qubits between traps are under development; the adiabatic optical (with off-resonant frequencies) and/or the electrical control (with additional electrodes) is assumed.

== Applications in Bose–Einstein condensation ==
Bose–Einstein condensation (BEC) requires conditions of very low density and very low temperature in a gas of atoms. Laser cooling in a magneto-optical trap (MOT) is typically used to cool atoms down to the microkelvin range. However, laser cooling is limited by the momentum recoils an atom receives from single photons. Achieving BEC requires cooling the atoms beyond the limits of laser cooling, which means the lasers used in the MOT must be turned off and a new method of trapping devised. Magnetic traps have been used to hold very cold atoms, while evaporative cooling has reduced the temperature of the atoms enough to reach BEC.

== Sources ==
- Pritchard, David E. (1983). "Cooling Neutral Atoms in a Magnetic Trap for Precision Spectroscopy". Physical Review Letters. 51 (15): 1336–1339. Bibcode:1983PhRvL..51.1336P. doi:10.1103/PhysRevLett.51.1336.
- Anderson, M. H.; Ensher, J. R.; Matthews, M. R.; Wieman, C. E.; Cornell, E. A. (1995). "Observation of Bose-Einstein Condensation in a Dilute Atomic Vapor". Science. 269 (5221): 198–201. Bibcode:1995Sci...269..198A. doi:10.1126/science.269.5221.198. PMID 17789847.
