= Angle of incidence (optics) =

Angle in geometric optics

The angle of incidence, in geometric optics, is the angle between a ray incident on a surface and the line perpendicular (at 90 degree angle) to the surface at the point of incidence, called the normal. The ray can be formed by any waves, such as optical, acoustic, microwave, and X-ray. In the figure below, the line representing a ray makes an angle θ with the normal (dotted line). The angle of incidence at which light is first totally internally reflected is known as the critical angle. The angle of reflection and angle of refraction are other angles related to beams.

In computer graphics and geography, the angle of incidence is also known as the illumination angle of a surface with a light source, such as the Earth's surface and the Sun. It can also be equivalently described as the angle between the tangent plane of the surface and another plane at right angles to the light rays. This means that the illumination angle of a certain point on Earth's surface is 0° if the Sun is precisely overhead and that it is 90° at sunset or sunrise.

Determining the angle of reflection with respect to a planar surface is trivial, but the computation for almost any other surface is significantly more difficult. (See specular reflection.)

Refraction of light at the interface between two media

== Grazing angle or glancing angle ==
Focusing X-rays with glancing reflection in a Wolter telescope

It is sometimes more useful to refer to the angle between the beam and the surface tangent, rather than that between the beam and the surface normal. The 90-degree complement to the angle of incidence is called the grazing angle or glancing angle. For example, a ray with 30° angle of incidence has a 60° grazing angle.

A beam or ray that is nearly parallel to a surface (i.e., having small grazing angles) is called a "grazing beam" or a "grazing ray". For example, grazing incidence diffraction is used in X-ray spectroscopy and atom optics, where significant reflection can be achieved only at small values of the grazing angle. Similarly, a Wolter telescope used for X-ray astronomy is based on the principle of total external reflection at small grazing angles. Moreover, ridged mirrors are designed to reflect atoms coming at a small grazing angle, usually measured in milliradians. In optics, there is Lloyd's mirror.

== Cameras ==
In an interchangeable lens camera, the combination of the throat diameter and the flange distance affect the angle of incidence. A larger throat and a smaller flange distance make for a larger angle of incidence, allowing for more flexibility in lens design, without requiring retrofocus designs for wider angle lenses.

== See also ==
- Effect of Sun angle on climate
- Phase angle (astronomy)
- Plane of incidence
- Reflection (physics)
- Refraction
- Scattering vector
- Total internal reflection
- Zenith angle
