= Cesia (visual appearance) =

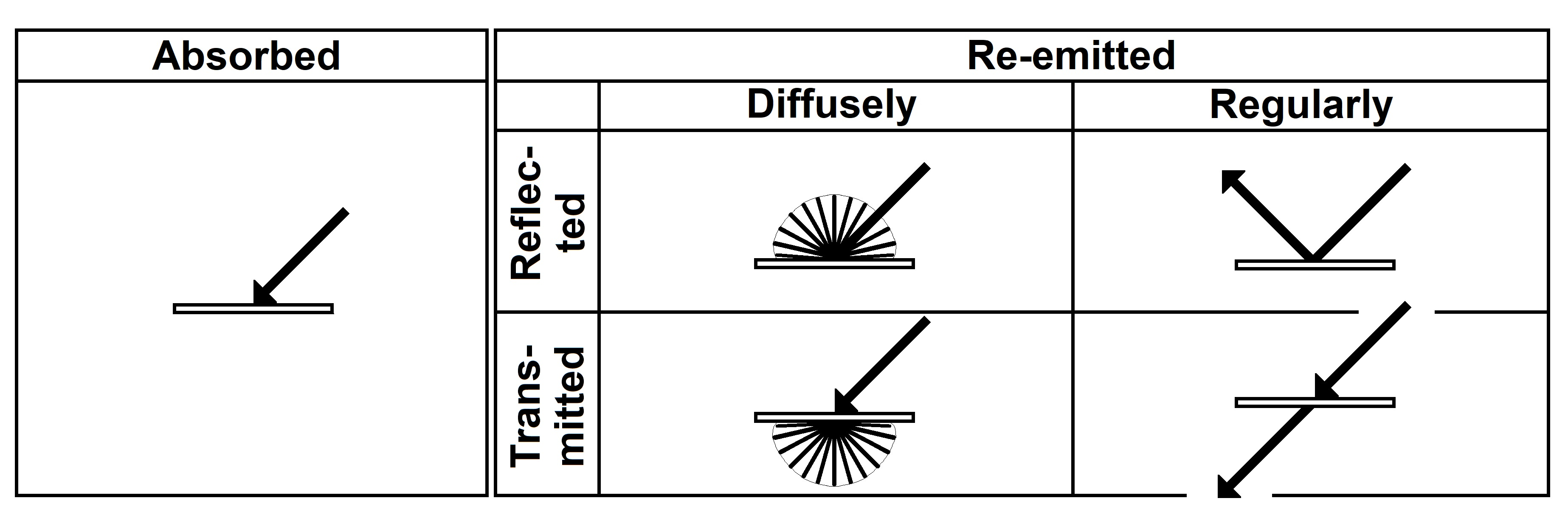
Possible spatial distributions of light incident on a surface.

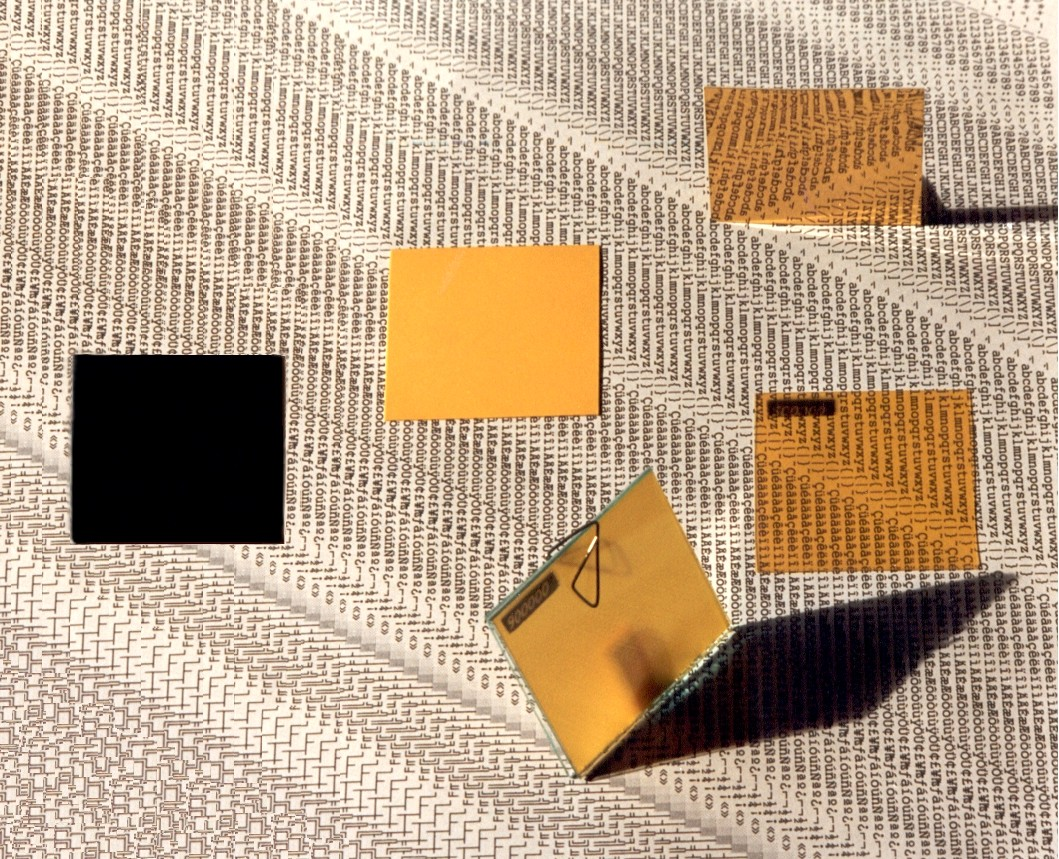
Five basic cesias: black, matte, specular, translucent, and transparent.

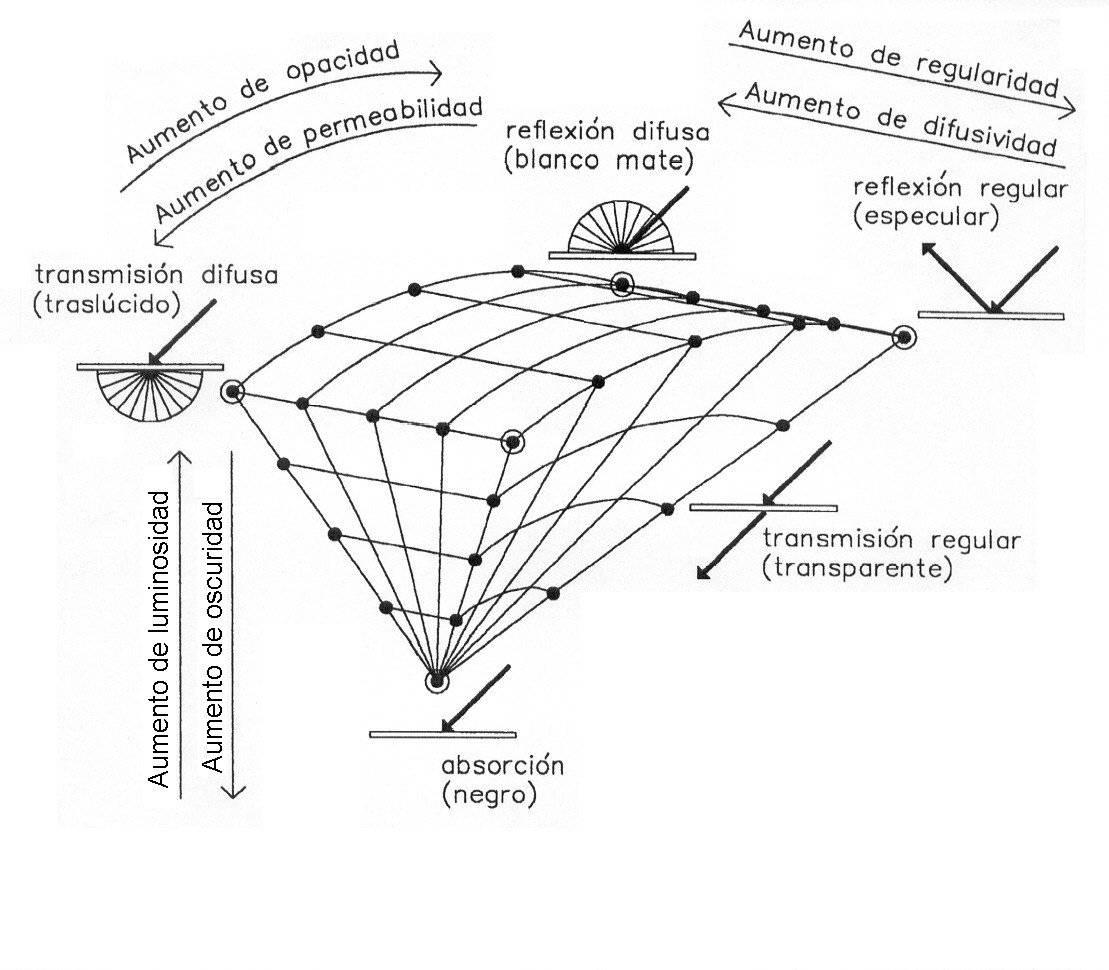
Diagram of the order system for cesias.

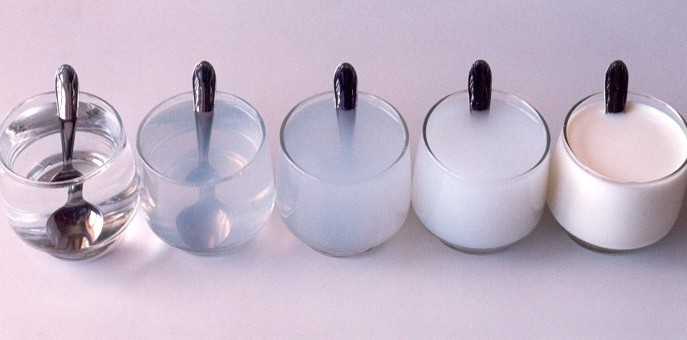
A scale of cesia: from transparent to opaque (variation of permeability), by mixing clear water and milk.

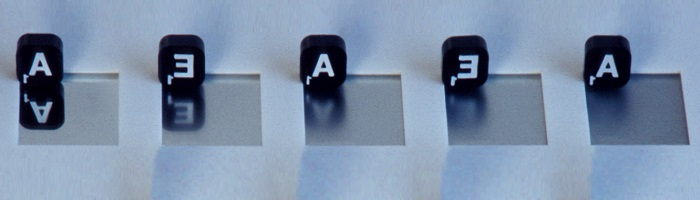
A scale of cesias from specular to matte (variation of diffusivity), by progressive tarnished of a mirror.

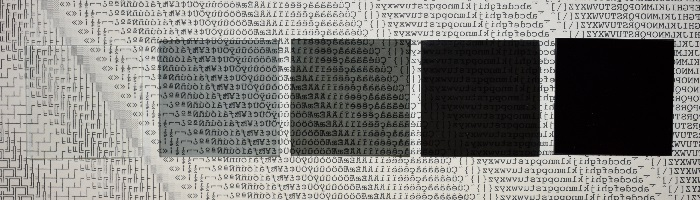
A scale of cesias from transparent to black (variation of darkness), using neutral density filters.

Cesia is the name given to visual appearances related to the perception of different spatial distributions of light. Light radiation that is not absorbed by an object can be reflected or transmitted either diffusely or regularly. These interactions of light with matter are perceived with a greater or lesser degree of gloss (from a mirror to a matte surface, as the extremes), more or less transparent, translucent or opaque, at different levels of darkness (according to the light-dark axis).

== Background and development of the concept ==
This is the same kind of phenomenon that Richard S. Hunter (1969) calls "geometric attributes of appearance". The advantage is that the concept of cesia encompasses all the involved aspects in a single word, and that all cesias have been organized in a three-dimensional order system according to three axes of variation, similar to color order systems or color models.

Before Richard Hunter, who also developed instruments for the measurement of these aspects of appearance, some other forerunners on these aspects include the German psychologist David Katz, the Optical Society of America (OSA), and the philosopher Ludwig Wittgenstein. Katz was the first to understand that there are different modes of color appearance, such as surface colors (opaque), film colors (related to transparency), volume colors (related to transparency but also to translucency), mirrored colors and luster. The Committee on Colorimetry of the OSA proposed eleven attributes to classify different aspects of visual appearance, of which the last three attributes are transparency, glossiness and luster. Among other issues, Wittgenstein discusses about the impossibility for something being called "transparent white", the relationship between "golden" and "yellow" (with and without gloss), which is similar to the relationship between "silver" and "gray", or the possibility of speaking about "black mirrors".

The axes of variation of cesia are: permeability to light (with transparent and opaque as the extremes), diffusivity (with diffuse and regular -or sharp- as the extremes), and darkness (with the poles light and dark -or black). The variable of diffusivity, which involves different degrees of light scattering, from zero to maximum, and the appearances in-between the two extremes, is related to the concept of distinctness of image (DOI).

The term "cesia" was proposed by César Jannello in the 1980s. Jannello died in 1985 without developing the concept in depth (beyond the fact that it refers to qualities or visual appearances such as transparency, translucency, gloss, opacity, etc.), and without devising an order system of cesias. This was the purpose of José Luis Caivano since the late eighties and early nineties. Subsequently, the concept of cesia was also taken up and expanded by other authors, who applied it to different fields: Green-Armytage (1993, 2017), Lozano (2006), Giglio (2015), Jofré (2017), to mention just a few.

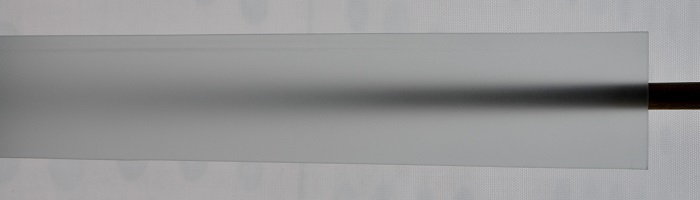
Gradual variation of cesia from translucent to transparent (change in diffusivity): Frosted glass at decreasing distances in front of an object.

== See also ==
- Distinctness of image
- Frosted glass
- Gloss (optics)
- Luster (textiles)
- Lustre prints
- Opacity (optics)
- Paint sheen
- Reflection (physics)
- Scattering theory
- Transparency and translucency
