= Haze meter =

A haze meter measures the amount of light that is diffused or scattered when passing through a transparent material. Transparency is important because a material needs to be more or less see-through depending on its practical usage, e.g. a grocery bag needs the light to be more diffused so that less can be seen while food packaging film needs the light to be less diffused so that the contents can be seen clearly. For reasons such as these haze meters are necessary to determine which material is needed for which practical purpose.

Haze is measured with a wide angle scattering test in which light is diffused in all directions which results in a loss of contrast. That percentage of light that when passing through that deviates from the incident beam by greater than 2.5 degrees on average is defined as haze

See through quality is measured with a narrow angle scattering test in which light is diffused in a small range with high concentration. This test measures the clarity with which finer details can be seen through the object being tested.

The haze meter also measures total transmittance. Total transmittance is the measure of the total incident light compared to the light that is actually transmitted (e.g. total transmittance). So the incident light may be 100%, but because of absorption and reflection the total transmittance may only be 94%.

The data gained from the haze meter can be transferred to a PC for further data processing to ensure a consistent product.
