= Sag resistance test =

Paint and other coatings that are on slanted or vertical surfaces tend to sag when first applied. The thickness of the coating as well as the composition and viscosity will affect the overall sagging and conversely the sag resistance. In order to find the sag resistance of a coating a simple test is used. A metal applicator bar is used along with a Drawdown card.

The applicator is U-shaped and is manufactured with a set of 1/4 inch (6.4 mm) wide notches. The notches are spaced 1/16 inch (1.6 mm) apart. The applicator bar is 5 inches (127 mm) wide and leaves 3 3/8 inches (86 mm) of applied coating behind after use. After the bar is drawn down the card with the coating, a series of parallel stripes with varying film thickness will be formed. The card is then placed on a vertical surface with the thickest of the stripes at the bottom. The coating will then sag downward and the clearance of the gap that produces the thickest film stripe, not sagging completely to the stripe below, is the anti-sag index of the coating.
