= Lustre prints =

Photograph or artwork with a finish between glossy and matte

Lustre print is a photograph or artwork with a finish between glossy and matte. Some companies use the term semi-glossy. Lustre photo prints are a hybrid of glossy photo prints and matte photo prints. Lustre photo prints have rich colour saturation that gives a vibrant colour finish and, like matte photo prints, they are not vulnerable to fingerprints, whereas glossy photo prints are prone to fingerprints.

== See also ==
- Coated paper
