= Distinctness of image =

Quantification of vision used in optics

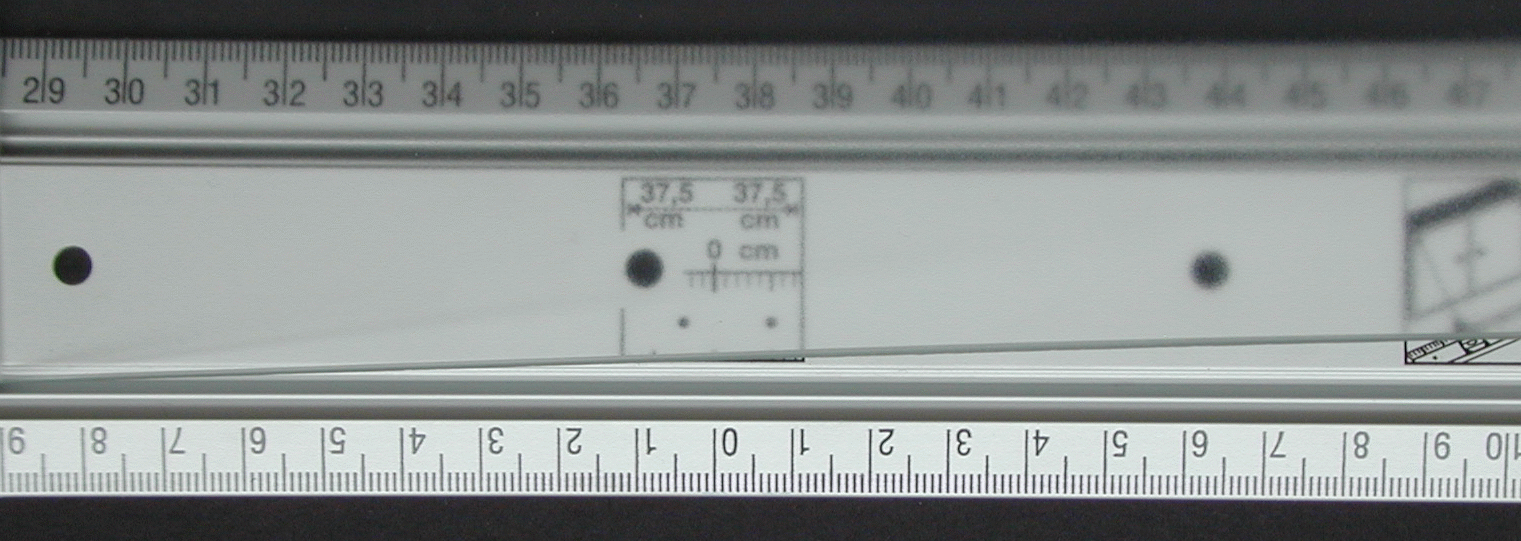
The blur induced by a scattering layer (here: frosted glass) increases with the distance between the information (ruler scaling) and the scattering layer. The scattering layer is close to the ruler surface on the left side and the distance increases to the right as does the blur. The distinctness of image decreases with increasing blur.

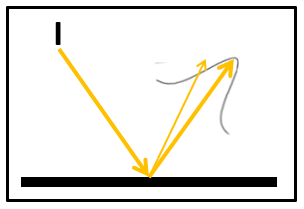
Distinctness of Image (DOI) Low DOI is caused by “large” surface structures distorting the reflected light. The surface is visible- orange peel. $DOI\varpropto dR/d\Theta$ $DOI \propto \frac{\Delta Reflectance}{\Delta Angle}$ Reflected image Quality (RIQ) RIQ is a more sensitive, updated version of DOI A new high sensitivity/high resolution sensor allows improved measurement. RIQ is a more sensitive, updated version of DOI $DOI\varpropto dR/d\Theta$ $Haze \propto \frac{\Delta Reflectance}{\Delta Angle}$ A new high sensitivity/high resolution sensor allows improved measurement.

Distinctness of image (DOI) is a quantification of the deviation of the direction of light propagation from the regular direction by scattering during transmission or reflection. DOI is sensitive to even subtle scattering effects; the more light is being scattered out of the regular direction the more the initially sharp (well defined) image is blurred (that is, small details are lost). In polluted air it is the sum of all particles of various dimensions (dust, aerosols, vapor, etc.) that induces haze.

DOI is measured to characterize the visual appearance of polished high-gloss surfaces such as automotive car finishes, mirrors, beyond the capabilities of gloss.

Other appearance phenomena are: gloss, haze, and orange peel. Various categories of visual appearance related to the perception of regular or diffuse reflection and transmission of light have been organized under the concept of cesia in an order system with three variables. In this system, DOI is connected to the variable called diffusivity.

== Reflected Image Quality (RIQ) vs. DOI ==
DOI is not sensitive to low amounts of orange peel on highest quality surfaces.

RIQ has more proportionate response to orange peel on a wider range of surface finishes.

RIQ works well in differentiating low gloss surfaces with different specular/diffuse components.

== Parameters that affect RIQ ==
- Substrate alignment (horizontal/vertical)
- Coating formulation
- Substrate
- Application technique
