= Frosted glass =

Type of translucent glass

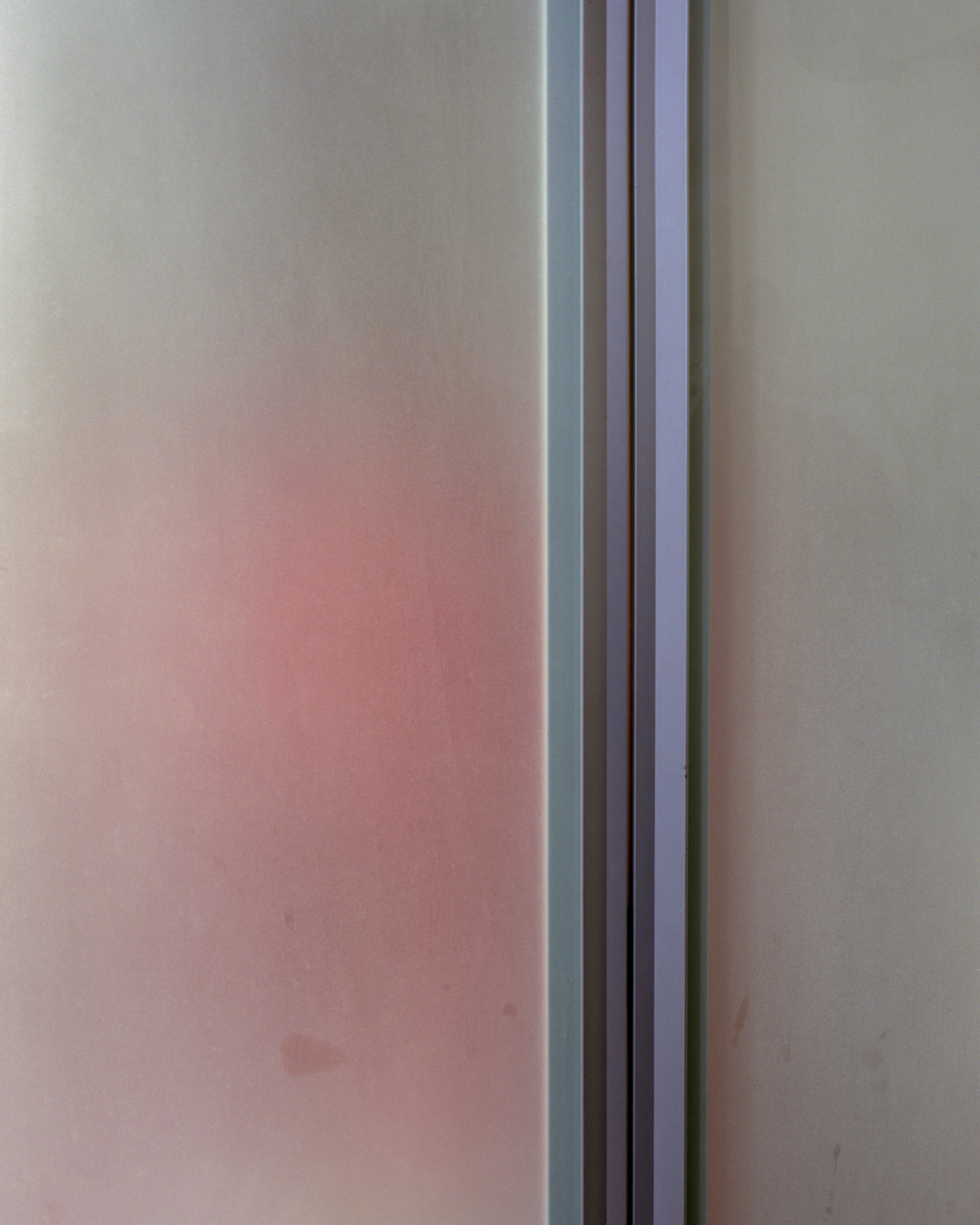
Frosted glass creates a blurry image.

Frosted glass is produced by the sandblasting or acid etching of clear sheet glass. This creates a pitted surface on one side of the glass pane and has the effect of rendering the glass translucent by scattering the light which passes through, thus blurring images while still transmitting light. It has 10–20% opacity.

== Applications ==
General applications include:

- To achieve visual privacy while still allowing light to pass through.
- To create decorative patterns on plain glass by using wax or other inhibitors to retain transparent areas.
- To distribute light uniformly in a photographic contact printer.
- To create an airtight seal in tubes.
- Decorative, aesthetic, or artistic intent.

The frosted glass effect can also be achieved by the application of vinyl film, used as a sort of stencil on the glass surface. "Photo-resist", or photo-resistant film is also available, which can be produced to mask off the area surrounding a decorative design, or logo on the glass surface. A similar effect may also be accomplished with the use of canned frosted glass sprays.

== Recycling issue ==
Frosted glass is not generally suitable for commercial recycling through glass recycling services. This is because the etchants used to produce some types of frosted glass can leave behind chemical residues, which can interfere with the recycling process and potentially contaminate a whole batch of recyclable materials. Frosted glass that has not been acid-etched but rather produced by sandblasting is technically recyclable in principle. However, since it can be difficult to tell how a given piece of frosted glass was manufactured, most recycling firms reject frosted glass without a contract with specific assurances.

== Gallery ==
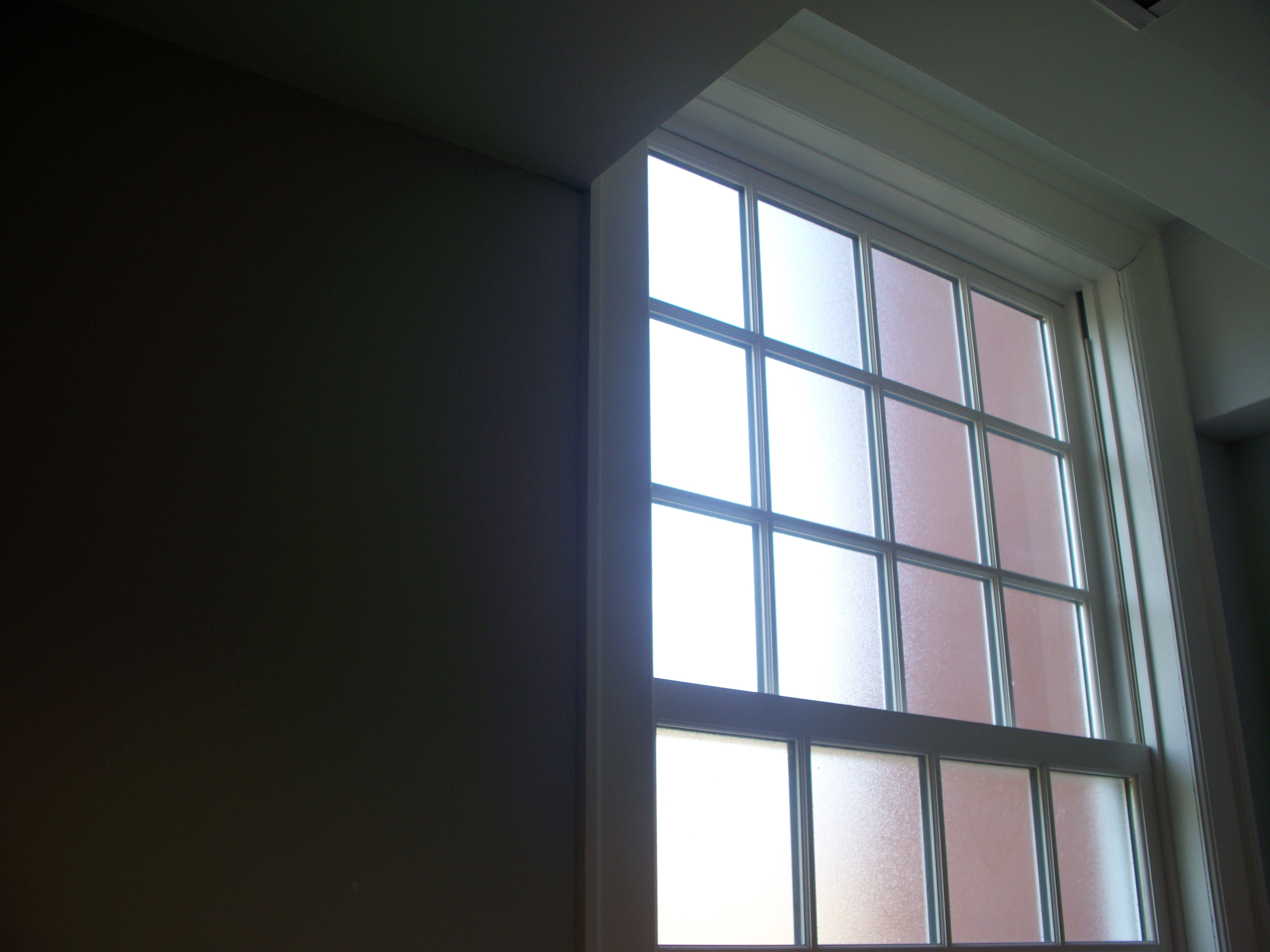
Frosted glass windows used in a restroom

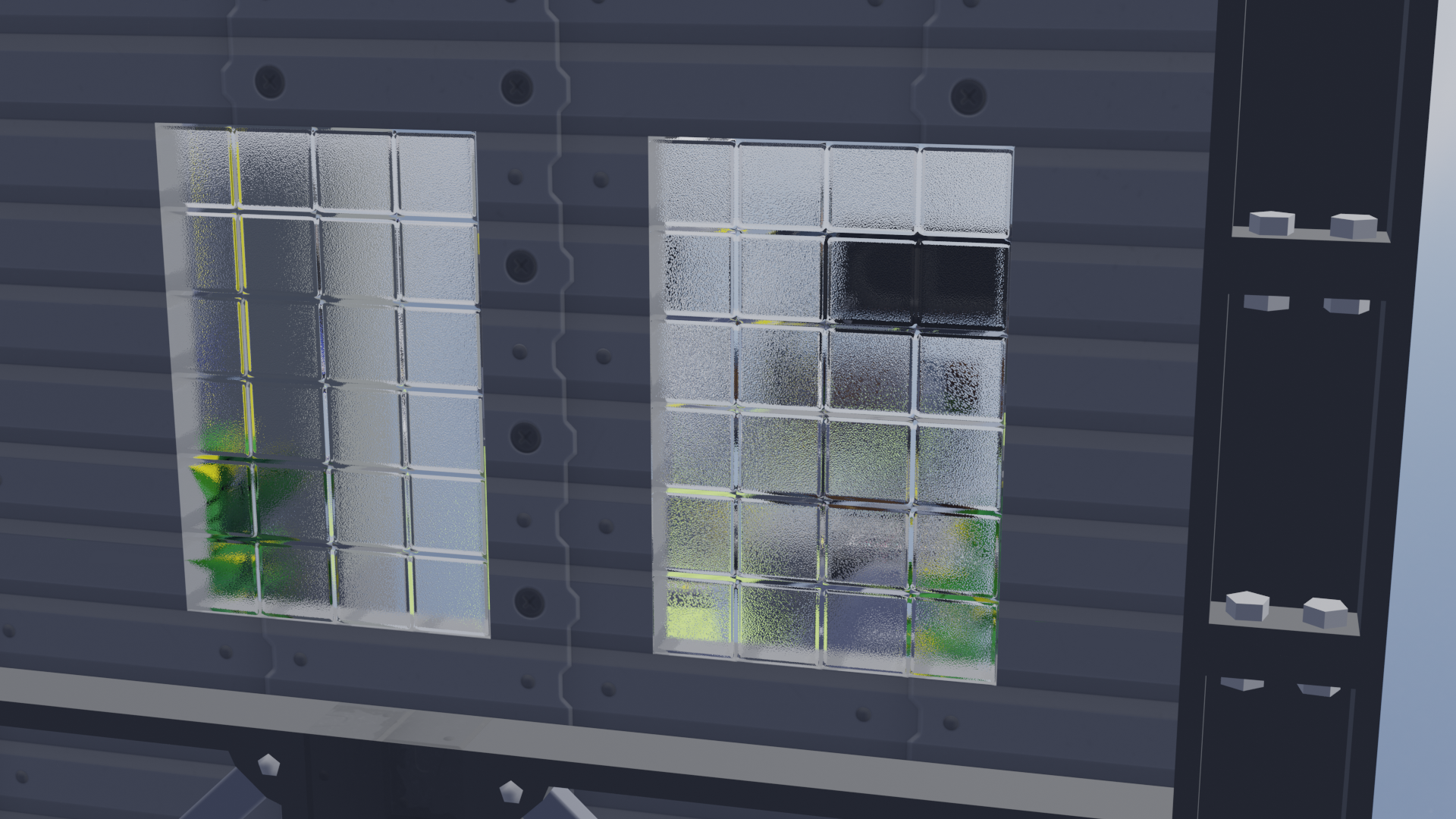
Digital Rendering of Frosted Glass on a Skyscraper using Blender's Eevee engine

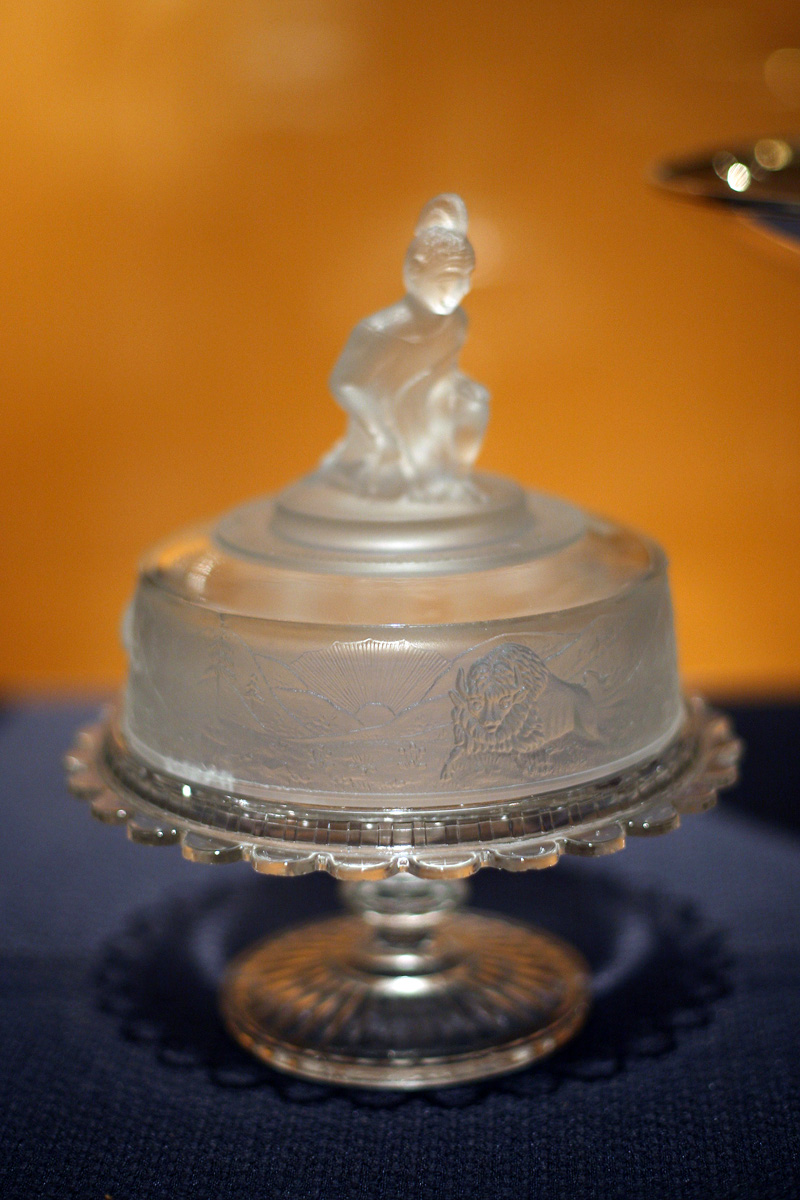
James Gillinder & Sons (1860 – c. 1935). "Westward Ho!" Compote, c. 1875. Pressed colorless and frosted glass

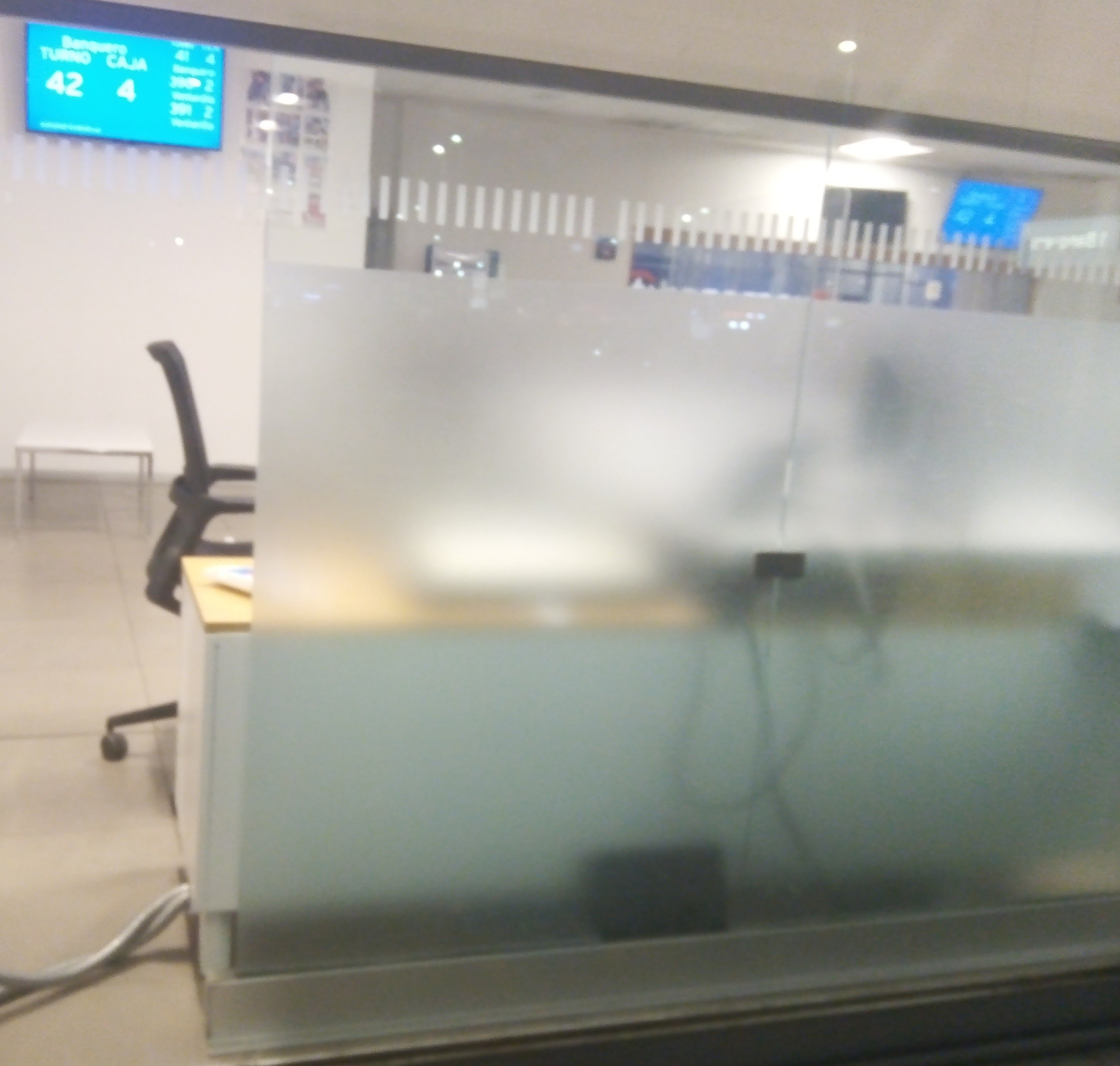
Frosted glass in an office

== See also ==
- Ground glass
- Ground glass joint
- Smart glass, of which some types are able to turn frosting on and off
