= Drawdown card =

Tool for assessing opacity and contrast ratio of coatings

Drawdown cards are used for testing paints and coatings through wet film preparation.

Black and white cards are used to measure both opacity and contrast ratio. By measuring reflectance values of both parts of the card one can gain a quantitative opacity value of a paint sample.

== See also ==
- Film applicator
- Glossmeter – Instrument for measuring specular reflection gloss
- Spectrometer – Used to measure spectral components of light
