= Film applicator =

A film applicator is a device used to evenly spread a substance, such as paint, ink, or cosmetics, over a substrate such as a drawdown card.

Applicators are usually metal bars that are manufactured to high tolerances to give consistent, repeatable results. Each bar will give a "theoretical wet film thickness" or, in other words, the thickness of the coating that should remain on the drawdown card after application. Even with high manufacturing tolerances, the actual wet film thickness can vary from 50% to 90% of the gap.

There are multiple types of bar applicators, their forms and uses are shown below. Film applicators follow the ASTM standard D823. Applicators can be used either manually or automatically.

== Manual film applicator ==
When using an applicator manually, small variations in speed and applied pressure are inevitable. These variations can affect the quality of the drawdown and thus the measurements of film properties such as abrasion resistance, hiding power and gloss.

== Automatic film applicator ==
The use of an automatic film applicator guarantees consistent speed and pressure, providing repeatable and high quality results.

Automatic film applicators vary in their construction. The most modern types of applicators use vacuum plates to hold the drawdown cards and allow a variety of application bars to be mounted. The speed and pressure of the bar can be adjusted to allow for customization of the final film thickness. The drawdown process is governed by ASTM standard D823.

== Types ==
=== Four-sided applicator ===
Used for high viscous coatings, this type of applicator has four different clearances built in, one on each horizontal surface.

=== Applicator frame ===
Used for low viscous coatings, this applicator also has four different clearances built in. It is used for non-rigid substances and has a two sided opening in the center of the bar.

=== Bar type or Bird applicator ===
This applicator has one, two or four clearances and contains a slanted trailing edge, also used for high viscous coatings. This is the most common type of film applicator.

== Gap ==
This is a wire wound bar at each end, the gap height is controlled by the wire diameter, very simple and very cost effective.

=== U shaped ===
This applicator also has two clearances but features a U-shaped form instead of a straight bar.

=== Square applicator or Octoplex applicator ===
The square applicator is the more versatile than previously mentioned applicators. It has 8 clearances in the form of a square frame. This tool combines the accuracy of fixed applicators with the versatility of adjustable applicators.

=== Film applicator knife ===
This adjustable applicator has a metal frame with an adjustable "knife" that acts as the gap clearance. These applicators are the most versatile manual applicator, but is also the least precise.

=== Wire-wound applicator ===
These applicators differ from the bar applicators as they consist of a metal rod wound with wire of varying thickness. The coating will pass through the gaps between the wires and level off at a uniform thickness. There are two main types of wire bars. Close wire wound bars will produce coating layers from 4 to 120μm. Higher coating thickness up to 500μm can be obtained using open wound bars.

== Testing ==
A standard procedure for testing substances that are applied in a liquid form, and then dry to a solid film, is to create a controlled, standardized test film of the substance, usually on a standardized substrate, such as a metal, plastic or paper panel.
