= Transparency meter =

A transparency meter, also called a clarity meter, is an instrument used to measure the transparency of an object. Transparency refers to the optical distinctness with which an object can be seen when viewed through plastic film/sheet, glass, etc. In the manufacture of sheeting/film, or glass the quantitative assessment of transparency is just as important as that of haze.

Transparency depends on the linearity of the passage of light rays through the material. Small deflections of the light, caused by scattering centers of the material, bring about a deterioration of the image. These deflections are much smaller than those registered in haze measurements. While haze measurements depend upon wide-angle scattering, clarity is determined by small-angle scattering. Wide and small angle scattering are not directly related to each other. By this, we mean that haze measurements cannot provide information about the clarity of the specimen and vice versa.

== Total Transmittance ==
An object's transparency is measured by its total transmittance. Total transmittance is the ratio of transmitted light to the incident light. There are two influencing factors; reflection and absorption. For example:

Incident light = 100% - (Absorption = -1% + Reflection = -5%) = Total Transmittance = 94%

== Industry Standards ==
ASTM International (formerly known as the American Society for Testing and Materials) is the main body which works within the industry and develops standards for various tests/instruments. They dictate that the industry standard for the clarity meter entails the following; 1. Reference beam, self-diagnosis, and enclosed optics 2. Built-in statistics with average, standard deviation, coefficient of variance, and min/max 3. Large storage capacity and data transfer to a PC. These standards are described in ASTM standard D 1746.
