= Opacity =

Property of an object or substance that is impervious to light

Comparisons of 1. opacity, 2. translucency, and 3. transparency; behind each panel is a star.

Opacity is the measure of impenetrability to electromagnetic or other kinds of radiation, especially visible light. In radiative transfer, it describes the absorption and scattering of radiation in a medium, such as a plasma, dielectric, shielding material, glass, etc. An opaque object is neither transparent nor translucent. When light strikes an interface between two substances, in general, some may be reflected, some absorbed, some scattered, and the rest transmitted (also see refraction).

Reflection can be diffuse, for example light reflecting off a white wall, or specular, for example light reflecting off a mirror. An opaque substance transmits no light, and therefore reflects, scatters, or absorbs all of it. Other categories of visual appearance, related to the perception of regular or diffuse reflection and transmission of light, have been organized under the concept of cesia in an order system with three variables, including opacity, transparency and translucency among the involved aspects.

Both mirrors and carbon black are opaque. Opacity depends on the frequency of the light being considered. For instance, some kinds of glass, while transparent in the visual range, are largely opaque to ultraviolet light. More extreme frequency-dependence is visible in the absorption lines of cold gases.

Different processes can lead to opacity, including absorption, reflection, and scattering.

== Radiopacity ==
Radiopacity is preferentially used to describe opacity of X-rays. In modern medicine, radiodense substances are those that will not allow X-rays or similar radiation to pass. Radiographic imaging has been revolutionized by radiodense contrast media, which can be passed through the bloodstream, the gastrointestinal tract, or into the cerebral spinal fluid and utilized to highlight CT scan or X-ray images. Radiopacity is one of the key considerations in the design of various devices such as guidewires or stents that are used during radiological intervention. The radiopacity of a given endovascular device is important since it allows the device to be tracked during the interventional procedure.

== Quantitative definition ==
The words "opacity" and "opaque" are often used as colloquial terms for objects or media with the properties described above. However, there is also a specific, quantitative definition of "opacity", used in astronomy, plasma physics, and other fields, given here.

In this use, "opacity" is another term for the mass attenuation coefficient (or, depending on context, mass absorption coefficient, the difference is described here) $\kappa_\nu$ at a particular frequency $\nu$ of electromagnetic radiation.

More specifically, if a beam of light with frequency $\nu$ travels through a medium with opacity $\kappa_\nu$ and mass density $\rho$, both constant, then the intensity will be reduced with distance x according to the formula
$$I(x) = I_0 e^{-\kappa_\nu \rho x}$$
where

- x is the distance the light has traveled through the medium
- $I(x)$ is the intensity of light remaining at distance x
- $I_0$ is the initial intensity of light, at $x = 0$

For a given medium at a given frequency, the opacity has a numerical value that may range between 0 and infinity, with units of length^{2}/mass.

Opacity in air pollution work refers to the percentage of light blocked instead of the attenuation coefficient (aka extinction coefficient) and varies from 0% light blocked to 100% light blocked:

$$\text{Opacity} = 100\% \left(1-\frac{I(x)}{I_0} \right)$$

=== Planck and Rosseland opacities ===
It is customary to define the average opacity, calculated using a certain weighting scheme. Planck opacity (also known as Planck-Mean-Absorption-Coefficient) uses the normalized Planck black-body radiation energy density distribution, $B_{\nu}(T)$, as the weighting function, and averages $\kappa_\nu$ directly:
$$\kappa_{Pl}={\int_0^\infty \kappa_\nu B_\nu(T) d\nu \over   \int_0^\infty B_\nu(T) d\nu }=\left( { \pi \over \sigma T^4}\right) \int_0^\infty \kappa_\nu B_\nu(T) d\nu ,$$
where $\sigma$ is the Stefan–Boltzmann constant.

Rosseland opacity (after Svein Rosseland), on the other hand, uses a temperature derivative of the Planck distribution, $u(\nu, T)=\partial B_\nu(T)/\partial T$, as the weighting function, and averages $\kappa_\nu^{-1}$,
$$\frac{1}{\kappa} = \frac{\int_0^{\infty} \kappa_{\nu}^{-1} u(\nu, T) d\nu }{\int_0^{\infty} u(\nu,T) d\nu}.$$
The photon mean free path is $\lambda_\nu = (\kappa_\nu \rho)^{-1}$. The Rosseland opacity is derived in the diffusion approximation to the radiative transport equation. It is valid whenever the radiation field is isotropic over distances comparable to or less than a radiation mean free path, such as in local thermal equilibrium. In practice, the mean opacity for Thomson electron scattering is:
$$\kappa_{\rm es} = 0.20(1+X) \,\mathrm{cm^2 \, g^{-1}}$$
where $X$ is the hydrogen mass fraction. For nonrelativistic thermal bremsstrahlung, or free-free transitions, assuming solar metallicity, it is:
$$\kappa_{\rm ff}(\rho, T) = 0.64 \times 10^{23} (\rho[ {\rm g}~ {\rm\, cm}^{-3}])(T[{\rm K}])^{-7/2} {\rm\, cm}^2 {\rm\, g}^{-1}.$$
The Rosseland mean attenuation coefficient is:
$$\frac{1}{\kappa} = \frac{\int_0^{\infty} (\kappa_{\nu, {\rm es}} + \kappa_{\nu, {\rm ff}})^{-1} u(\nu, T) d\nu }{\int_0^{\infty} u(\nu,T) d\nu}.$$

== See also ==
- Absorption (electromagnetic radiation)
- Mathematical descriptions of opacity
- Molar absorptivity
- Reflection (physics)
- Gloss (optics)
- Cesia (visual appearance)
- Scattering theory
- Transparency and translucency
- Kappa mechanism
