= Orange peel (effect) =

Kind of finish that may develop on painted and cast surfaces

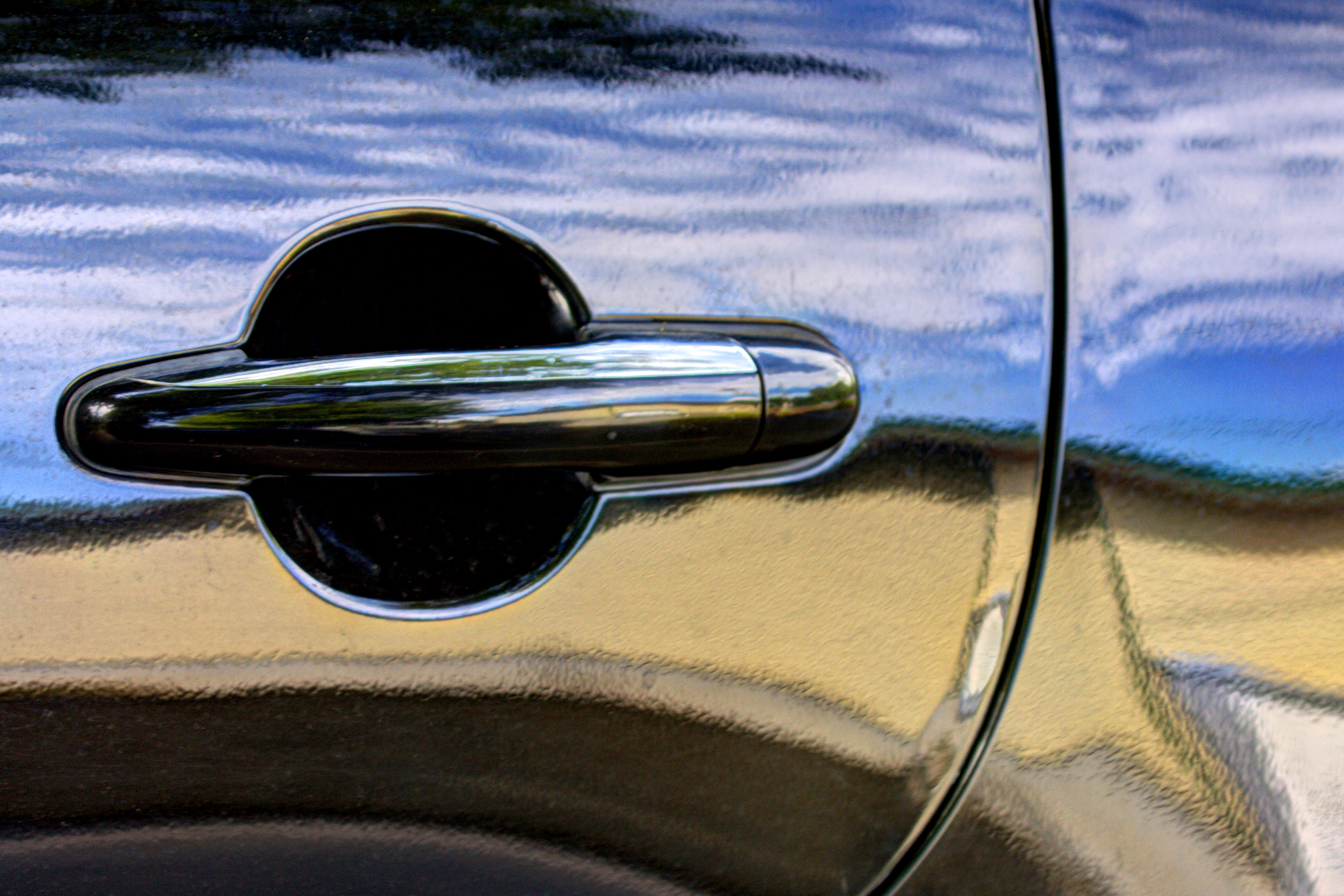
A photo of the orange peel effect on a car door.

Orange peel is a certain kind of finish that may develop on painted and cast surfaces. The texture resembles the surface of the skin of an orange, hence the name "orange peel".

Gloss paint sprayed on a smooth surface (such as the body of a car) should also dry into a smooth surface. However, various factors can cause it to dry into a bumpy surface. This is typically the result of improper painting technique, and is caused by the quick evaporation of thinner, incorrect spray gun setup (e.g., low air pressure or incorrect nozzle), spraying the paint at an angle other than perpendicular, or applying excessive paint.

Such a texture can be smoothed out with ultra-fine sandpaper, but it can be prevented altogether by changing the painting technique or the materials used.

In some situations, such as interior house paint, the orange peel texture is desirable. In this case, a texture paint is generally applied with a spray gun. The texture is then painted over with the appropriate color. When painting walls, orange peel can also develop by using a roller with too little paint or too thick a paint and the surface dries before the texture can level.
