= Paint sheen =

Glossiness of a paint finish

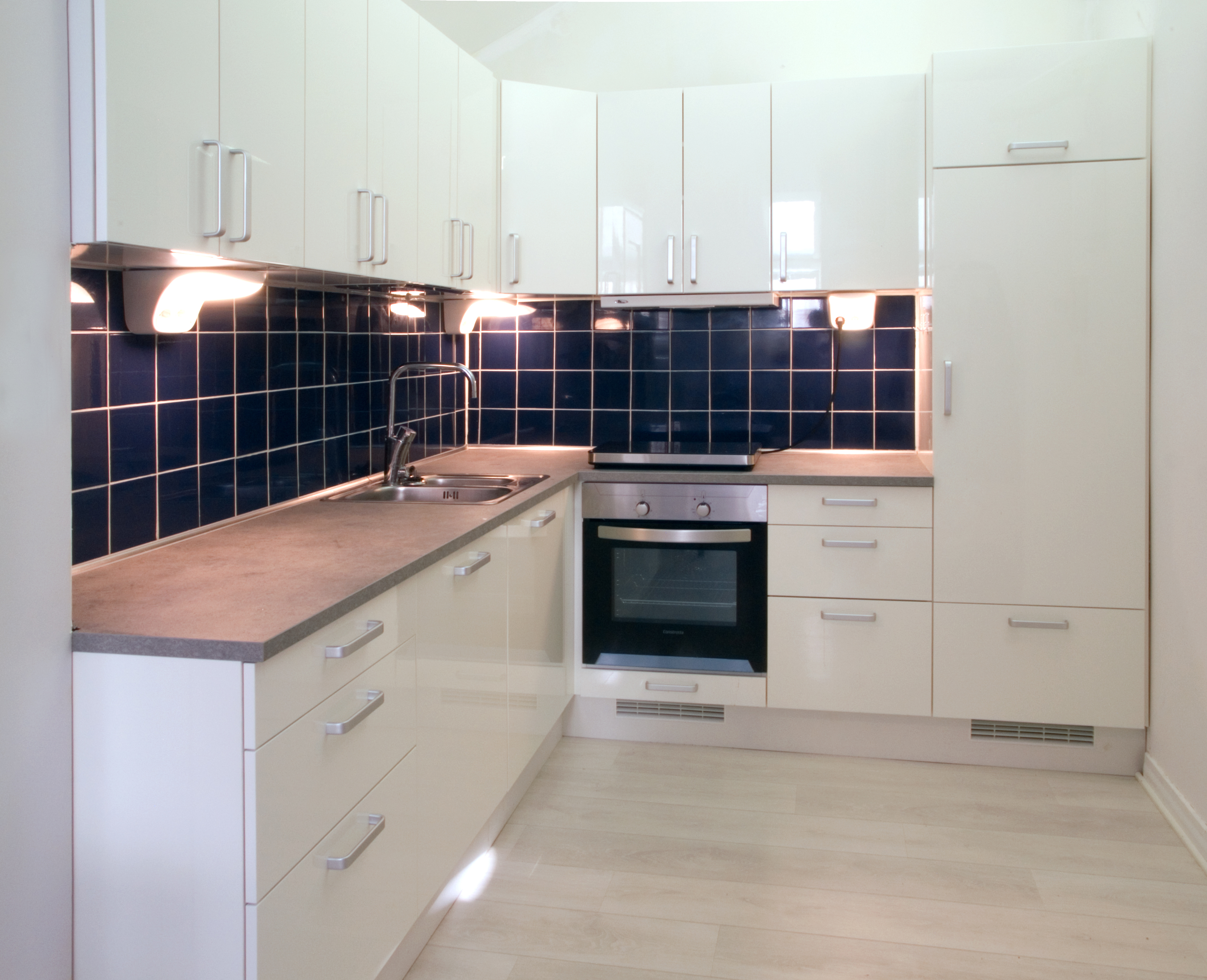
High-gloss finish used for kitchen elements

Sheen is a measure of the reflected light (glossiness) from a paint finish. Glossy and flat (or matte) are typical extreme levels of glossiness of a finish. Gloss paint is shiny and reflects most light in the specular (mirror-like) direction, while on flat paints most of the light diffuses in a range of angles. The gloss level of paint can also affect its apparent colour.

Between those extremes, there are a number of intermediate gloss levels. Their common names, from the most dull to the most shiny, include matte, eggshell, satin, silk, semi-gloss and high gloss. These terms are not standardized, and not all manufacturers use all these terms.

== Terminology ==
Firwood, a UK paint manufacturer, measures gloss as percentages of light reflected from an emitted source back into an apparatus from specified angles, ranging between 60° and 20° depending on the reflectivity. With very low gloss levels (such as matte finishes), a 60° angle is too great to measure light reflectance accurately, so a lower angle of 20° is usually used.

The returned light into the apparatus allows the gloss to be classified as follows:

- Full gloss: 70–90%
- Semi-gloss: 41–69%
- Satin: 26–40%
- Sheen: 15–25%
- Eggshell: 10–15%
- Matte: <10%

== Technology ==
Scattering of light on finishes with 75% (matte), 50% (satin) and ~35% (glossy) pigment-volume concentration. Still lower PVCs (below critical) do not affect sheen, but only permeability.

The sheen or gloss level of a paint is mainly determined by the ratio of resinous binder, which solidifies after drying, to solid pigment. More binder creates a smoother surface with regular reflection, while less binder exposes pigment grains, scattering light and producing a matte effect. Gloss is also influenced by factors such as the refractive index of the pigment, and the viscosity and refractive index of the binder.

An important indicator is pigment-volume concentration (PVC), defined as the ratio of pigment volume and total paint volume:

$$\text{PVC} = \frac{V_\text{pigment}}{V_\text{pigment} + V_\text{binder}}$$

PVC affects both physical and optical properties of a paint. Matte paints have less binder, which makes them more susceptible to mechanical damages (however, they are less visible than on glossy surfaces). More binder provides a smoother and more solid surface. However, at a certain PVC, called critical PVC (CPVC), the paint is already saturated with binder and the surface becomes solid and glossy, without protruding particles; adding more binder (lowering PVC) will not affect the sheen. CPVC generally depends on the binder-pigment system used, and generally falls in the 35–65% range.

As a gloss finish reveals surface imperfections such as sanding marks, surfaces must be prepared more carefully for it. Gloss paints are generally more resistant to damage, staining, and easier to clean than flat paints. Flat paint may become glossier through burnishing or grease, while glossy paint may lose its sheen if abraded. Unlike gloss paint, flat paint can often be touched up locally without repainting the entire surface.

Gloss level can be characterized by the angular distribution of light scattered from a surface, measured with a glossmeter, but there are various ways of measuring this, and different industries have different standards.

== Applications ==
In traditional household interiors, walls are usually painted in flat or eggshell gloss, wooden trim (including doors and window sash) in high gloss, and ceilings almost invariably in flat. Similarly, exterior trim is usually painted with a gloss paint, while the body of the house is painted in a lower gloss.

Gloss paint is commonplace in the automotive industry for car bodies.
