= Merli–Missiroli–Pozzi experiment =

Single-electron double-slit experiment

Merli–Missiroli–Pozzi setup
- Inventor: Pier Giorgio Merli; Gian Franco Missiroli; Giulio Pozzi
- Related items: Double-slit experiment, Electron biprism

The Merli–Missiroli–Pozzi experiment was a physics experiment conducted in 1974 that provided the first conclusive evidence of electron interference involving the detection of single electrons. Performed by Italian physicists Pier Giorgio Merli, Gian Franco Missiroli, and Giulio Pozzi at the University of Bologna and the Italian Research Council (CNR), the experiment is physically similar to a double-slit experiment with electrons described as a thought experiment by Richard Feynman in 1961.

A popular science poll conducted by Physics World in 2002 selected the single-electron double-slit experiment as the "most beautiful experiment in physics" of all time but the history of the experiment was not well understood until subsequent historical research later that year.

== Historical context ==
Since the inception of quantum mechanics, the dual wave–particle nature of matter was a subject of intense theoretical debate. While light interference had been demonstrated by Thomas Young in 1801, and electron diffraction by crystals was demonstrated in the 1920s, the ability to observe single electron interference was considered a gedankenexperiment (thought experiment) by Richard Feynman in the early 1960s.

Prior to the 1974 Bologna experiment, other scientists had made incremental steps. In 1909 Geoffrey Ingram Taylor demonstrated interference of light under such low intensity that single photons formed the image. In 1955, Gottfried Möllenstedt and Heinrich Düker applied their newly invented electron biprism to observe interference fringes with electron beams, confirming the de Broglie relation for electrons. Claus Jönsson demonstrated many-electron interference through micro-slits in 1961, again with electron beams. However, the Merli–Missiroli–Pozzi team was the first to successfully use a low-intensity beam to ensure that only one electron at a time passed through the apparatus. In 1976, the team produced a film titled Interferenza di elettroni (Interference of Electrons), documenting the pattern buildup.

In 1989, Akira Tonomura and colleagues published results from their work on interference with low-intensity electron sources using an electron biprism. In 2002 an informal popular science poll highlighted "double-slit experiment with electrons" as the "most beautiful science experiment", but no one was credited with performing the experiment. A follow up article focusing on the double-slit experiment cited 1989 Tonomura version originally, but, prompted by a letter to the editor, subsequently pointed to the earlier Merli–Missiroli–Pozzi work.

Other versions of the experiment have also been performed. The Merli–Missiroli–Pozzi experiment used an electron biprism to demonstrate interference. A fully double slit experiment with electrons to match that used in experiments with light was published in 2013.

== Experimental setup ==
Matter wave double slit diffraction pattern building up electron by electron. Each white dot represents a single electron hitting a detector; with a statistically large number of electrons interference fringes appear.

The experiment utilized a modified transmission electron microscope (TEM) equipped with an electron biprism. The lenses of the microscope are used to create an effective source for the electrons that reach the biprism. The biprism was an extremely thin wire with a radius $r = 2 \times 10^{-7}$ m placed between two grounded plates. When a voltage $V$ was applied to the wire, it created an electric field that deflected the electron beam differently depending upon which side of the wire the electrons passed on. Further down the system the electrons from the two sides overlap over a region of width $W$ given by the formula:

$$W = 2 \frac{a + b}{a} \left( \alpha \frac{ab}{a + b} - r \right)$$

Where:

- $a$: the distance between the effective electron source and the biprism wire.
- $b$: the distance between the biprism wire and the observation plane.
- $\alpha$: the deflection angle produced by the biprism potential for electrons passing on the two sides.
- $r$: the radius of the biprism wire.

If the electrons behaved as classical particles then the intensity over the region would be constant. With a coherent source such as a field emission gun fringes appear as the electrons behave as waves.

The system is equivalent to a Fresnel optical biprism where electrons appear to be emitted from two virtual sources, $S_1$ and $S_2$, separated by a distance $d = 2\alpha a$. Using the relativistically corrected wavelength $\lambda$, the fringes have a periodicity $l = \lambda(a + b)/d$.

Using a high-sensitivity television camera and a monitor, they observed the arrival of individual electrons. Each electron appeared as a single, localized dot, behaving like a particle when it was detected. Over time, the accumulated dots formed a characteristic interference pattern, demonstrating wave behavior where the intensity averaged over many millions of events follow the probability distribution similar to an optical biprism.

== See also ==
- Diffraction
- Electron holography
- Matter wave
