= Gottfried Möllenstedt =

German physicist and professor

- Born: 14 September 1912; Versmold, Germany
- Died: 11 September 1997 (aged 84); Tübingen, Germany
- Education: Gdańsk University of Technology
- Known for: Electron holography
- Scientific career
- Fields: Physics
- Workplaces: University of Tübingen
- Thesis: Messungen an den Interferenzerscheinungen im konvergenten Elektronenbündel (1940)
- Doctoral advisor: Walther Kossel
- Doctoral students: Claus Jönsson

Gottfried Möllenstedt (14 September 1912 – 11 September 1997) was a German physicist and professor at the University of Tübingen, where he founded the Institute of Applied Physics in 1957, and served as rector from 1966 to 1968. Together with his doctoral student Heinrich Düker (1923–1985), in 1955 he invented the electron biprism, which is widely used in electron holography.

== Life ==
Möllenstedt was the fourth of eight children of the teacher, cantor and vice-principal Johann Heinrich Möllenstedt; he had two sisters and five brothers. At first he wanted to become an aircraft engineer, but then, impressed by his teachers Walther Kossel and Eberhard Buchwald, turned to physics in 1934.Under Walther Kossel he obtained his diploma in engineering at the Gdańsk University of Technology in 1939, and received his doctorate on electron diffraction on 17 December 1940. On 11 October 1940, he married the teacher Dorothea Tanner. From 1939 to 1945 he was Kossel's research assistant in Gdańsk, and on 30 January 1945, he received his habilitation. In February 1945, Möllenstedt and Kossel escaped from besieged Gdańsk to build an alternative laboratory, a research center for metals in Thuringia.

In 1947 Möllenstedt became research assistant and head of the electronics laboratory at Carl Zeiss AG. He later moved to the University of Tübingen, to reunite with his teacher Kossel. There he become associate professor for applied physics in 1953 and full professor and director of the institute for applied physics in 1960. In 1963 he was elected as dean of mathematics and natural sciences faculty, and from 1966 to 1968 he served as rector of the university. Between 1963 and 1971 he also headed the astronomy faculty. He retired in 1980, and died on 11 September 1997 after a long and illness. He was survived by wife Dorothea and two sons, Ulrich and Manfred.

== Work ==
Möllenstedt started his research in Gdańsk where he worked on electron diffraction artifacts, which were named Kossel-Möllenstedt patterns. In 1948–49 he developed the Möllenstedt speed analyzer to characterize plasmons in solids.In 1950, in Mosbach, he found that an electron beam can be split by a thin tungsten wire to create a double image. From this effect, in 1955 he developed the Möllenstedt biprism,together with his doctoral student Heinrich Düker (1923–1985). This prism made Möllenstedt a pioneer of electron interferometry. Around 1960 he developed electron and ion beam lithography, together with R. Speidel.Earlier in 1959, he supervised the double-slit experiment by Claus Jönsson, which in 2002 was named "the most beautiful experiment" by readers of Physics World.

== Awards and honors ==
- Körber European Science Prize (1987)
