= Atom interferometer =

Interferometer which uses the wave-like nature of atoms

An atom interferometer is a type of interferometer that uses the wave-like nature of atoms in order to produce interference. In atom interferometers, the roles of matter and light are reversed compared to the laser based interferometers, i.e. the beam splitter and mirrors are lasers while the source emits matter waves (the atoms) rather than light. In this sense, atom interferometers are the matter wave analog of double-slit, Michelson-Morley, or Mach-Zehnder interferometers typically used for light. Atom interferometers measure the difference in phase acquired by atomic matter waves traversing different paths. Matter waves may be controlled and manipulated using systems of lasers. Atom interferometers have been used in tests of fundamental physics, including measurements of the gravitational constant, the fine-structure constant, and universality of free fall. Applied uses of atom interferometers include accelerometers, rotation sensors, and gravity gradiometers.

== Overview ==
Interferometry splits a wave into a superposition along two different paths. A spatially dependent potential or a local interaction differentiates the paths, introducing a phase difference between waves. Atom interferometers use center of mass matter waves with short de Broglie wavelength. Experiments using molecules have been proposed to search for the limits of quantum mechanics by leveraging the molecules' shorter De Broglie wavelengths.

== History ==
Interference of atom matter waves was first observed by Immanuel Estermann and Otto Stern in 1930, when a sodium (Na) beam was diffracted off a surface of sodium chloride (NaCl). The first modern atom interferometer reported was a double-slit experiment with metastable helium atoms and a microfabricated double slit by O. Carnal and Jürgen Mlynek in 1991, and an interferometer using three microfabricated diffraction gratings and Na atoms in the group around David E. Pritchard at the Massachusetts Institute of Technology (MIT). Shortly afterwards, an optical version of a Ramsey spectrometer typically used in atomic clocks was recognized also as an atom interferometer at the Physikalisch-Technische Bundesanstalt (PTB) in Braunschweig, Germany. The largest physical separation between the partial wave packets of atoms was achieved using laser cooling techniques and stimulated Raman transitions by Steven Chu and his coworkers in Stanford University.

In 1999, the diffraction of C_{60} fullerenes by researchers from the University of Vienna was reported. Fullerenes are comparatively large and massive objects, having an atomic mass of about 720 Da. The de Broglie wavelength of the incident beam was about 2.5 pm, whereas the diameter of the molecule is about 1 nm, about 400 times larger. In 2012, these far-field diffraction experiments could be extended to phthalocyanine molecules and their heavier derivatives, which are composed of 58 and 114 atoms respectively. In these experiments the build-up of such interference patterns could be recorded in real time and with single molecule sensitivity.

In 2003, the Vienna group also demonstrated the wave nature of tetraphenylporphyrin—a flat biodye with an extension of about 2 nm and a mass of 614 Da. For this demonstration they employed a near-field Talbot–Lau interferometer. In the same interferometer they also found interference fringes for C_{60}F_{48}, a fluorinated buckyball with a mass of about 1600 Da, composed of 108 atoms. Large molecules are already so complex that they give experimental access to some aspects of the quantum-classical interface, i.e., to certain decoherence mechanisms. In 2011, the interference of molecules as heavy as 6910 Da could be demonstrated in a Kapitza–Dirac–Talbot–Lau interferometer. In 2013, the interference of molecules beyond 10,000 Da has been demonstrated.

The 2008 comprehensive review by Alexander D. Cronin, Jörg Schmiedmayer, and David E. Pritchard documents many new experimental approaches to atom interferometry. More recently atom interferometers have begun moving out of laboratory conditions and have begun to address a variety of applications in real world environments.

== Interferometer types ==
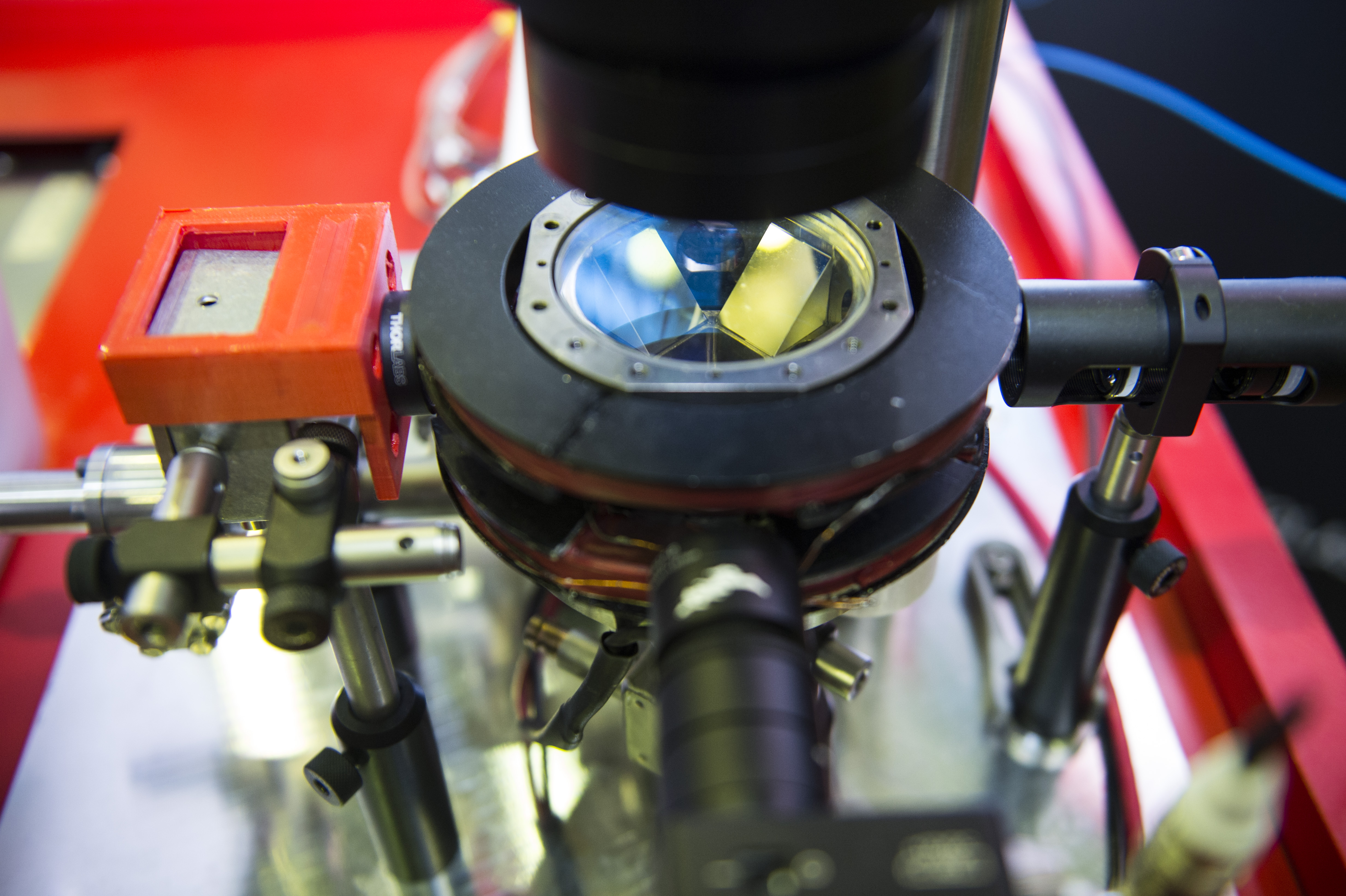
A compact magneto-optical trap, the first step in generating an atom interferometer.

While the use of atoms offers easy access to higher frequencies (and thus accuracies) than light, atoms possess mass and move slower; thus they are affected more noticeably by gravity compared to beams of light. In some apparatuses, the atoms are ejected upwards and the interferometry takes place while the atoms are in flight, or while falling in free flight. In other experiments gravitational effects by free acceleration are not negated; additional forces are used to compensate for gravity. These guided systems in principle can provide arbitrary amounts of measurement time, provided quantum coherence is preserved.

The early atom interferometers deployed slits or wires for the beam splitters and mirrors. Later systems, especially the guided ones, used light forces for splitting and reflecting of the matter wave.

=== Light pulse atom interferometer ===
A prototypical technique for atom interferometry involves splitting, reflecting, and recombining atomic matter waves using pulses of light. This technique is also called the Kasevich-Chu atom interferometer, named after the authors of the 1991 paper. This method employs counter-propagating beams of light that produce transitions between two quantum states labeled $|0 \rangle$ and $|1\rangle$. Both lasers are tuned off-resonance from the excited state by a frequency Δ to avoid resonantly exciting and heating the atoms.

In addition to changing the spin state of the atom, the counter-propagating Raman transition provides a momentum kick $\hbar \vec{k}_{eff} = \hbar ( \vec{k}_2 - \vec{k}_1 )$ to one of the components. In a spin–momentum basis, a pulse of Raman light interacting with an atom will transition between $|0, 0\rangle$ and $|1, \hbar \vec{k}_{eff}\rangle$. Applying a $\pi/2$ pulse (see Ramsey interferometer) light to $\psi_0 = |0, 0 \rangle$ produces the entangled state $\psi_1 = \frac{1}{\sqrt{2}}\left(|0, 0\rangle + |1, \hbar \vec{k}_{eff}\rangle\right)$.

The interferometer is formed by three Raman pulses in a $\pi/2$–$\pi$–$\pi/2$ configuration separated by a common non-interaction time $T$. This scheme is analogous to a Mach–Zehnder interferometer for light, where the first pulse splits the matter wave to travel along two different trajectories, the second pulse reflects the packets back toward each other, and the final pulse recombines the matter wave. The measured state of the matter wave after the interferometer sequence depends on the total phase difference $\Delta \varphi$ accumulated along the two different trajectories, yielding a final probability of being in one of the states as
$$P = \frac{1}{2} \left(1-C \cos(\Delta \varphi)\right),$$
where $C$ is the visibility or contrast of the interferometer fringe. Since the matter wave is in free-fall with respect to gravity, the phase difference depends on the gravitational acceleration $g$ as
$$\Delta \varphi = \vec{k}_{eff} \cdot \vec{g}~ T^2 + \Delta \phi_L,$$
where $\Delta \phi_L$ is any additional phase difference of the Raman laser beam arising between the light pulses.

The sensitivity of the interferometer to gravitational or inertial forces depends on:

- The space–time area enclosed by the interferometer, which increases for larger $T$.
- The relative phase stability of the counter-propagating Raman beams.
- The number of atoms in the cold, trapped ensemble that complete the interferometer. A larger fraction of participating atoms increases $C$. Due to the Doppler effect, atoms with finite temperature may not experience exactly $\pi/2$ or $\pi$ Raman pulses.

== Examples ==
Group	Year	Atomic species	Method	Measured effect(s)
Pritchard	1991	Na, Na_{2}	Nano-fabricated gratings	Polarizability, index of refraction
Clauser	1994	K	Talbot–Lau interferometer	
Zeilinger	1995	Ar	Standing light wave diffraction gratings	
Helmke Bordé	1991		Ramsey–Bordé	Polarizability, Aharonov–Bohm effect: exp/theo $0.99 \pm 0.022$, Sagnac effect 0.3 rad/s/$\surd$Hz
Chu	1991; 1998	Na Cs	Kasevich–Chu interferometer Light pulses Raman diffraction	Gravimeter: $3 \cdot 10^{-10}$ Fine-structure constant: $\alpha\pm 1.5 \cdot 10^{-9}$
Kasevich	1997; 1998	Cs	Light pulses Raman diffraction	Gyroscope: $2\cdot 10^{-8}$rad/s/$\surd$Hz, Gradiometer:
Berman			Talbot-Lau	
Mueller	2018	Cs	Ramsey-Bordé interferometer	Fine-structure constant: $\alpha\pm 2 \cdot 10^{-10}$

== Applications ==
=== Gravitational physics ===
A precise measurement of gravitational redshift was made in 2009 by Holger Muller, Achim Peters, and Steven Chu. No violations of general relativity were found to 7×10^{−9}.

In 2020, Peter Asenbaum, Chris Overstreet, Minjeong Kim, Joseph Curti, and Mark A. Kasevich used atom interferometry to test the principle of equivalence in general relativity. They found no violations to about 10^{−12}.

The sensitivity of an atom interferometer to external influences generally improves as the matter wave's separation time increases. High sensitivity free-fall interferometers hence require long drop distances. For example, the MAGIS-100 experiment at Fermilab employs a 100-meter drop tower, aiming to detect gravitational waves and ultralight dark matter, which is known to interact with regular matter only via gravity.

Space-based atom interferometers may be more sensitive to weak gravitational waves than terrestrial observatories such as LIGO.

=== Inertial navigation ===
Atomic interferometer gyroscopes (AIG) and atomic spin gyroscopes (ASG) use atomic interferometer to sense rotation or in the latter case, uses atomic spin to sense rotation with both having compact size, high precision, and the possibility of being made on a chip-scale.

== See also ==
- Electron interferometer
- Ramsey interferometry
