= Giulio Pozzi =

Italian physicist

Professor Giulio Pozzi
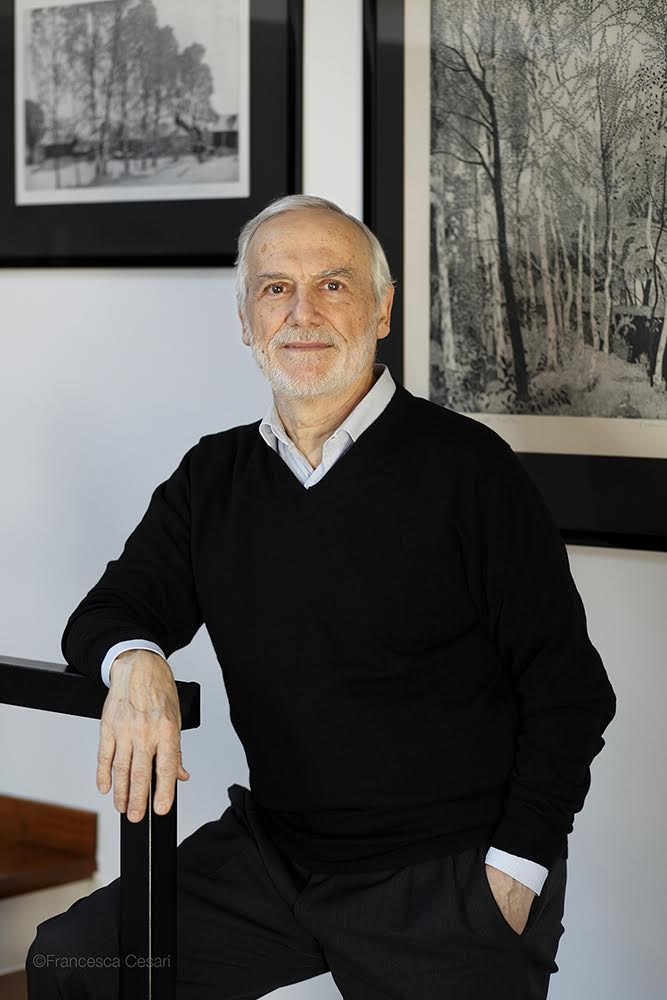
- Born: Riva del Garda, Trento, Italy
- Education: University of Bologna
- Scientific career
- Fields: Physics, Electron Microscopy, Electron Interferometry and Holography
- Workplaces: University of Bologna

Giulio Pozzi is an Italian physicist. His research activity was mainly devoted to the development of electron microscopy techniques applied to the study of magnetic and electric fields. The eponymous Merli–Missiroli–Pozzi experiment, which he performed together with Pier Giorgio Merli and Gian Franco Missiroli, was a version of the double slit experiment with single electrons.

Born in Riva del Garda in 1945, he graduated in Bologna in 1968.

He was a full professor at the Physics Department of the University of Bologna.

He has contributed to the development of a research line on interferometry and electron holography and has collaborated with major national and international research centers. He has published over two hundred scientific articles in Italian and international journals. He retired from teaching in 2011, but continued to pursue his research interests as Alma Mater Professor at the Department of Physics and Astronomy of the University of Bologna until 2017.

He is the co-author of the documentary Electron interference (1976), which won a prize at the Brussels Scientific Movie Festival in 1976.

== Works ==
- Particles and Waves in Electron Optics and Microscopy ISBN 978-0-12-804814-6
