= Akira Tonomura =

Japanese physicist

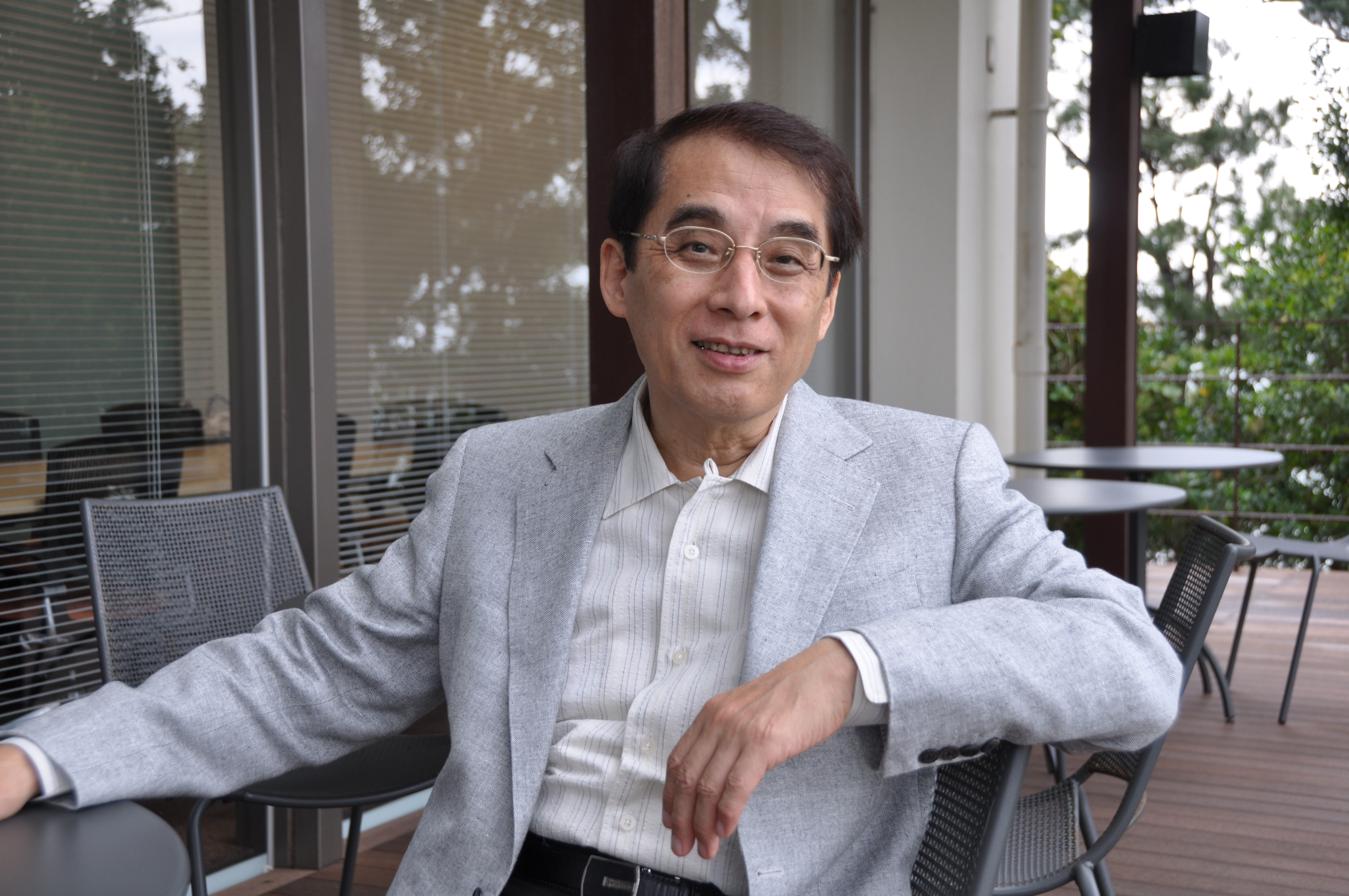
- Tonomura in 2009
- Born: April 25, 1942; Hyōgo, Japan
- Died: May 2, 2012 (aged 70)
- Known for: development of electron holography
- Awards: Japan Academy Prize (1991); The Franklin Medal (1999)
- Scientific career
- Fields: Physics

Akira Tonomura (外村 彰, Tonomura Akira; April 25, 1942 – May 2, 2012) was a Japanese physicist, best known for his development of electron holography and his experimental verification of the Aharonov–Bohm effect.

== Biography ==
Tonomura was born in Hyōgo, Japan, and graduated from the University of Tokyo with a degree in physics. Upon graduation he joined the Hitachi Central Research Laboratory, where he later attained the title "Fellow" in 1999.

In the 1970s, Tonomura did pioneering work in the development of the electron holography microscope and observed lines of magnetic force for the first time in the world. Building on this, in 1986, he experimentally verified the Aharonov–Bohm effect, which had eluded definitive experimental proof for a long time. This experiment proved that vector potentials, which are nothing more than a mathematical concept in classical physics, are in fact physical quantities that are more fundamental (i.e. have ontological priority) than electric or magnetic fields.

Tonomura was also known for his observations of magnetic vortex movement in superconductors.

== List of books available in English ==
- Electron Holography, 2nd edition/A. Tonomura, Springer, Springer Series in Optical Sciences (1999)
