= David E. Pritchard =

American physicist

David Edward Pritchard
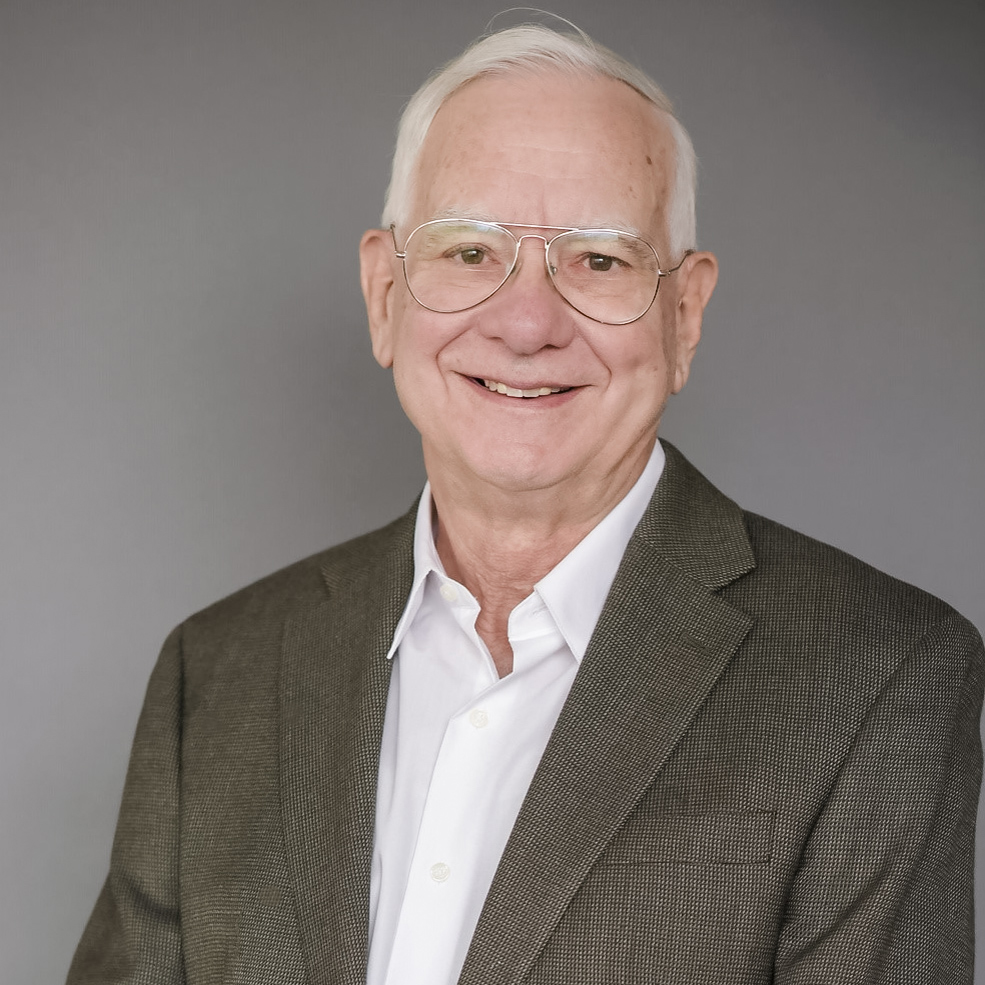
- Born: October 15, 1941 (age 84); New York, U.S.
- Education: California Institute of Technology (MA); Harvard University (PhD)
- Scientific career
- Fields: Atomic physics
- Workplaces: Massachusetts Institute of Technology
- Thesis: Differential Spin Exchange Scattering: Sodium on Cesium. (1968)
- Doctoral advisor: Daniel Kleppner
- Doctoral students: Eric Cornell
- Other notable students: Jerome Apt (Astronaut)
- Website: web.mit.edu/physics/people/faculty/pritchard_david.html

David Edward Pritchard (born October 15, 1941) is a professor at the Massachusetts Institute of Technology (MIT) who specializes in atomic physics and educational research.

== Career ==
=== Early work ===
Pritchard completed his PhD in 1968 at Harvard University under the supervision of Daniel Kleppner. His thesis involved building the first atomic scattering machine with polarized atoms to study differential spin exchange scattering, a process by which the 21 cm hydrogen line manifests.

Pritchard was an early adopter of tunable lasers in physics and chemistry, demonstrating high-resolution spectroscopy through the simultaneous absorption of two laser photons. He employed both laser and radio-frequency spectroscopy to study weakly bound van der Waals molecules, such as NaNe and KAr, in cold supersonic molecular beams.

=== Atom optics, atom traps, and atom interferometers ===
Pritchard made use of tunable lasers' ability to transfer momentum to atoms, leading to demonstrations of the diffraction of atoms from a standing wave of light (denoted Kapitza-Dirac or Raman-Nath regimes) and Bragg scattering of atoms from light gratings, founding the field of coherent atom optics. This led to the creation of the first atom interferometer, where matter waves would propagate on both sides of a metal foil before recombining, so that different interactions on the two sides would result in a fringe shift of the atomic interference pattern. This allowed for precise measurements of atomic polarizability, the refractive index of gaseous matter waves, and fundamental testing of quantum decoherence, as well as the first demonstration of the ability of atom interferometers to measure angular velocity like a gyroscope and to work for complex particles like Na_{2} molecules in the gaseous phase.

A singularly important development from atom optics is Pritchard's invention of the magneto-optical trap which captures and cools atoms to sub-millikelvin temperatures and of the Dark SPOT MOT, in which atoms are confined in a way such that they do not interact with trapping light. Together with a magnetic atom trap, it can compress ~ 10^{10} cold atoms into the same small volume (This is sometimes called the Ioffe-Pritchard trap to honor its plasma physics origin). These traps are commonly used in the field of cold atom research and are the foundational tools for the MIT-Harvard Center for Ultracold Atoms.

In 1990, Pritchard brought Wolfgang Ketterle to MIT as a postdoctoral researcher to work on atom cooling. To encourage Ketterle to stay at MIT, in 1993 Ketterle was given his own experimental cold atom program (with two students and two grants) while Pritchard himself stepped aside from the field to allow Ketterle to be appointed to the faculty. Ketterle pursued atom cooling to achieve Bose–Einstein condensation in 1995, a discovery for which Ketterle was awarded the Nobel Prize in Physics in 2001, alongside Pritchard's former graduate student, Eric Allin Cornell, and Carl Wieman, who was an informal Pritchard mentee while an undergraduate at MIT.

Ketterle and Pritchard then partnered to study atom optics and interferometry with Bose condensates, demonstrating coherent amplification of matter waves, superradiant Rayleigh scattering, and the power of Bragg spectroscopy to probe the condensate and used laser light to establish coherence between two condensates that never touch. Pritchard received the 2004 Max Born Award, "For creative application of light to new forms of spectroscopy, to manipulation and trapping of atoms, and for pioneering the new fields of atom optics and atom interferometry".

=== Precise measurements of atomic masses ===
Pritchard is a pioneer in the precise measurement of atomic and molecular masses using ion traps, an advance enabled by his group's developing highly sensitive radio-frequency detectors based on SQUIDs (superconducting quantum interference devices) and techniques to coherently cross-couple the motion of different modes of an ion's oscillation in the trap. These advances culminated in an ion balance in which one each of two different ions were simultaneously confined while their cyclotron frequencies were inter-compared to better than one part in 10^{11}. This led to the discovery of a new type of systematic shift of the cyclotron frequency due to the polarizability of the ion, providing the most accurate measurement of ionic molecule polarizability. It also resulted in a fifty-fold improvement of experimental tests of Albert Einstein's mass–energy equivalence that $E=mc^2$ (where E is the energy, m is the mass and c the speed of light) – now at ½ part per million.

Precise measurements of the masses of rubidium and caesium atoms made with the MIT apparatus have been combined with others' high-precision atom interferometric measurements of h/m (the Planck constant divided by the atom mass) to give the most accurate value of the fine structure constant at 0.2 ppb (parts per billion), differing by ~ 2.5 combined errors from measurement based on quantum electrodynamics. This is the most precise comparison of measurements made using entirely different theoretical bases.

== Teaching and education software ==
In 1998, David Pritchard and his son Alex developed an online Socratic tutor, mycybertutor.com, which provides specific critiques of incorrect symbolic answers, hints upon request, and follow-up comments and questions. This tool has been shown to significantly improve students' ability to answer traditional MIT examination problems, increasing their performance by approximately 2 standard deviations. The software is now marketed as Mastering Physics, Mastering Chemistry, and Mastering Astronomy by Pearson Education. It has become a widely used homework tutor in Science and Engineering, with approximately 2.5 million.

Pritchard's education research group, RELATE was started in 2000 with the goal to "Apply the principles and techniques of science and engineering to study and improve learning, especially of expertise". They conduct research using all components in the acronym RELATE - Research in Learning, Assessing, and Tutoring Effectively. They showed that copying online homework is by far the best predictor of a low final exam grade in MIT residential physics, and is the dominant contributor to ~ 5% of the certificates given by edX. They explored new types of instruction (e.g. deliberate practice of critical problem-solving skills) or variations in instruction (adding a diagram, replacing multiple choice questions with more interactive drag and drop questions, etc.) compared with traditional instruction (the control).

These experiments, along with other relevant research, indicated an important principle that students were struggling with – strategic thinking – the ability to determine which concepts and procedures are helpful in solving an unfamiliar problem. For this purpose, RELATE developed a Mechanics Reasoning Inventory that measures strategic ability; it served as a benchmark of progress for their new pedagogy: Modeling Approach to Problem-Solving. This pedagogy was shown to greatly improve students' attitudes towards learning science, raise their scores on the Physics 1 final exam retake, and subsequently help them improve their Physics 2 grade by ~ 1/2 standard deviation relative to students who didn't benefit from this intervention.
