= Claus Jönsson =

German physicist (1930–2024)

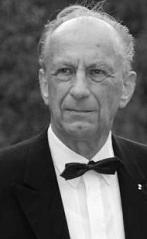
- Jönsson in 2008
- Born: 26 May 1930; Charlottenburg, Berlin, Germany
- Died: 25 August 2024 (aged 94); Tübingen, Germany
- Education: University of Tübingen
- Scientific career
- Thesis: Elektroneninterferenzen an mehreren künstlich hergestellten Feinspalten (1959)
- Doctoral advisor: Gottfried Möllenstedt

Claus Jönsson (26 May 1930 – 25 August 2024) was a German applied physicist who specialized in electron microscopy.

== Life ==
Jönsson was born in Charlottenberg, Berlin, Germany in 1930 and grew up near Hamburg. He matriculated at the University of Tübingen to study physics in 1953. Due to a critical shortage of student housing, he had to rent a space 12 km away.

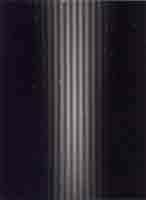
The interference fringes of electrons from Jönsson's experiment of 1959

Jönsson came under the tutelage of Gottfried Möllenstedt, the "German pope" of electron microscopy. In 1961, Jönsson published the results of his double-slit experiment performed with beams of electrons, something previously thought to be unfeasible in practice. Jönsson conducted his experiment in 1959 for his doctoral dissertation at Tübingen, working late at night. He discovered how to focus a narrow beam of electrons traveling towards the slits, resulting in the familiar interference pattern. He observed interference fringes for up to five slits. Jönsson's original paper was published in English for the first time in 1974 on the American Journal of Physics. The journal's editors, Anthony French and Edwin Taylor, praised the experiment as "great" but noted that "pedagogically clean fundamental experiments" such as this one would likely not bring professional fame. Indeed, Jönsson's experiment had been largely unknown and the double-slit experiment for electrons (and other quantum objects) was typically presented as a thought experiment. More advanced versions of Jönsson's experiment were subsequently performed, including with individual electrons being sent towards the slits.

Even so, in 2002, Jönsson's work was named "the most beautiful experiment" by readers of Physics World.

He served as a professor at the Institute for Applied Physics at Tübingen from 1978 to his retirement in 1995.

== See also ==
- Matter wave
- Wave–particle duality
- Electron interferometer
