= Hydrodynamic quantum analogs =

Similar behavior of quantum systems to droplets bouncing on a fluid

Superwalking droplet

In physics, the hydrodynamic quantum analogs refer to experimentally-observed phenomena involving bouncing fluid droplets over a vibrating fluid bath that behave analogously to several quantum-mechanical systems. The experimental evidence for diffraction through slits has been disputed, however, though the diffraction pattern of walking droplets is not exactly the same as in quantum physics, it does appear clearly in the high memory parameter regime (at high forcing of the bath) where all the quantum-like effects are strongest.

A droplet can be made to bounce indefinitely in a stationary position on a vibrating fluid surface. This is possible due to a pervading air layer that prevents the drop from coalescing into the bath. For certain combinations of bath surface acceleration, droplet size, and vibration frequency, a bouncing droplet will cease to stay in a stationary position, but instead "walk" in a rectilinear motion on top of the fluid bath. Walking droplet systems have been found to mimic several quantum mechanical phenomena including particle diffraction, quantum tunneling, quantized orbits, the Zeeman Effect, and the quantum corral.

Besides being an interesting means to visualise phenomena that are typical of the quantum-mechanical world, floating droplets on a vibrating bath have interesting analogies with the pilot wave theory, one of the many interpretations of quantum mechanics in its early stages of conception and development. The theory was initially proposed by Louis de Broglie in 1927. It suggests that all particles in motion are actually borne on a wave-like motion, similar to how an object moves on a tide. In this theory, it is the evolution of the carrier wave that is given by the Schrödinger equation. It is a deterministic theory and is entirely nonlocal. It is an example of a hidden variable theory, and all non-relativistic quantum mechanics can be accounted for in this theory. The theory was abandoned by de Broglie in 1932, gave way to the Copenhagen interpretation, but was revived by David Bohm in 1952 as De Broglie–Bohm theory. The Copenhagen interpretation does not use the concept of the carrier wave or that a particle moves in definite paths until a measurement is made.

== Physics of bouncing and walking droplets ==
=== History ===
Floating droplets on a vibrating bath were first described in writing by Jearl Walker in a 1978 article in Scientific American.

In 2005, Yves Couder and his lab were the first to systematically study the dynamics of bouncing droplets and discovered most of the quantum mechanical analogs.

John Bush and his lab expanded upon Couder's work and studied the system in greater detail. In 2015 three separate groups, including John Bush, attempted to reproduce the effect and were unsuccessful.

=== Stationary bouncing droplet ===
A fluid droplet can float or bounce over a vibrating fluid bath because of the presence of an air layer between the droplet and the bath surface. The behavior of the droplet depends on the acceleration of the bath surface. Below a critical acceleration, the droplet will take successively smaller bounces before the intervening air layer eventually drains from underneath, causing the droplet to coalesce. Above the bouncing threshold, the intervening air layer replenishes during each bounce so the droplet never touches the bath surface. Near the bath surface, the droplet experiences equilibrium between inertial forces, gravity, and a reaction force due to the interaction with the air layer above the bath surface. This reaction force serves to launch the droplet back above the air like a trampoline. Molacek and Bush proposed two different models for the reaction force.

=== Walking droplet ===
For a small range of frequencies and drop sizes, a fluid droplet on a vibrating bath can be made to "walk" on the surface if the surface acceleration is sufficiently high (but still below the Faraday instability). That is, the droplet does not simply bounce in a stationary position but instead wanders in a straight line or in a chaotic trajectory. When a droplet interacts with the surface, it creates a transient wave that propagates from the point of impact. These waves usually decay, and stabilizing forces keep the droplet from drifting. However, when the surface acceleration is high, the transient waves created upon impact do not decay as quickly, deforming the surface such that the stabilizing forces are not enough to keep the droplet stationary. Thus, the droplet begins to "walk."

== Quantum phenomena on a macroscopic scale ==
A walking droplet on a vibrating fluid bath was found to behave analogously to several different quantum mechanical systems, namely particle diffraction, quantum tunneling, quantized orbits, the Zeeman effect, and the quantum corral.

=== Single and double slit diffraction ===
It has been known since the early 19th century that when light is shone through one or two small slits, a diffraction pattern appears on a screen far from the slits. Light has wave-like behavior, and interferes with itself through the slits, creating a pattern of alternating high and low intensity. Single electrons also exhibit wave-like behavior as a result of wave-particle duality. When electrons are fired through small slits, the probability of the electron striking the screen at a specific point shows an interference pattern as well.

In 2006, Couder and Fort demonstrated that walking droplets passing through one or two slits exhibit similar interference behavior. They used a square shaped vibrating fluid bath with a constant depth (aside from the walls). The "walls" were regions of much lower depth, where the droplets would be stopped or reflected away. When the droplets were placed in the same initial location, they would pass through the slits and be scattered, seemingly randomly. However, by plotting a histogram of the droplets based on scattering angle, the researchers found that the scattering angle was not random, but droplets had preferred directions that followed the same pattern as light or electrons. In this way, the droplet may mimic the behavior of a quantum particle as it passes through the slit.

Despite that research, in 2015 three teams: Bohr and Andersen's group in Denmark, Bush's team at MIT, and a team led by the quantum physicist Herman Batelaan at the University of Nebraska set out to repeat the Couder and Fort's bouncing-droplet double-slit experiment. Having their experimental setups perfected, none of the teams saw the interference-like pattern reported by Couder and Fort. Droplets went through the slits in almost straight lines, and no stripes appeared.

It has since been shown that droplet trajectories are sensitive to interactions with container boundaries, air currents, and other parameters. Though the diffraction pattern of walking droplets is not exactly the same as in quantum physics, and is not expected to show a Fraunhofer-like dependence of the number of peaks on the slit width, the diffraction pattern does appear clearly in the high memory regime (at high forcing of the bath).

=== Quantum tunneling ===
Quantum tunneling is the quantum mechanical phenomenon where a quantum particle passes through a potential barrier. In classical mechanics, a classical particle could not pass through a potential barrier if the particle does not have enough energy, so the tunneling effect is confined to the quantum realm. For example, a rolling ball would not reach the top of a steep hill without adequate energy. However, a quantum particle, acting as a wave, can undergo both reflection and transmission at a potential barrier. This can be shown as a solution to the time dependent Schrödinger Equation. There is a finite, but usually small, probability to find the electron at a location past the barrier. This probability decreases exponentially with increasing barrier width.

The macroscopic analogy using fluid droplets was first demonstrated in 2009. Researchers set up a square vibrating bath surrounded by walls on its perimeter. These "walls" were regions of lower depth, where a walking droplet may be reflected away. When the walking droplets were allowed to move around in the domain, they usually were reflected away from the barriers. However, surprisingly, sometimes the walking droplet would bounce past the barrier, similar to a quantum particle undergoing tunneling. In fact, the crossing probability was also found to decrease exponentially with increasing width of the barrier, exactly analogous to a quantum tunneling particle.

=== Quantized orbits ===
When two atomic particles interact and form a bound state, such the hydrogen atom, the energy spectrum is discrete. That is, the energy levels of the bound state are not continuous and only exist in discrete quantities, forming "quantized orbits." In the case of a hydrogen atom, the quantized orbits are characterized by atomic orbitals, whose shapes are functions of discrete quantum numbers.

On the macroscopic level, two walking fluid droplets can interact on a vibrating surface. It was found that the droplets would orbit each other in a stable configuration with a fixed distance apart. The stable distances came in discrete values. The stable orbiting droplets analogously represent a bound state in the quantum mechanical system. The discrete values of the distance between droplets are analogous to discrete energy levels as well.

=== Zeeman effect ===
When an external magnetic field is applied to a hydrogen atom, for example, the energy levels are shifted to values slightly above or below the original level. The direction of shift depends on the sign of the z-component of the total angular momentum. This phenomenon is known as the Zeeman Effect.

In the context of walking droplets, an analogous Zeeman Effect can be demonstrated by observing orbiting droplets in a vibrating fluid bath. The bath is also brought to rotate at a constant angular velocity. In the rotating bath, the equilibrium distance between droplets shifts slightly farther or closer. The direction of shift depends on whether the orbiting drops rotate in the same direction as the bath or in opposite directions. The analogy to the quantum effect is clear. The bath rotation is analogous to an externally applied magnetic field, and the distance between droplets is analogous to energy levels. The distance shifts under an applied bath rotation, just as the energy levels shift under an applied magnetic field.

=== Quantum corral ===
Researchers have found that a walking droplet placed in a circular bath does not wander randomly, but rather there are specific locations the droplet is more likely to be found. Specifically, the probability of finding the walking droplet as a function of the distance from the center is non-uniform and there are several peaks of higher probability. This probability distribution mimics that of an electron confined to a quantum corral.

== See also ==
- De Broglie–Bohm theory
- Superfluid vacuum theory
- Quantum hydrodynamics
