= Ontological priority =

Concept in philosophy

Ontological priority is a philosophical concept that was first introduced by Aristotle (384–322 BCE) in his influential book Categories, in about 350 BCE. For over two millennia, this concept has influenced the reasonings of many philosophers (e.g., Aristotelians) and has influenced some discussion in ontology and logic. (Aristotle also makes numerous references to priority, as well as posterity, in two of his most influential works, Physics and Metaphysics.)

When something (be it an idea or a physical object) is said to be "ontologically prior" to something else (i.e., idea/object/property, tone, or quality), it is literally to say something exists before something else exists. To use René Descartes's famous phrase, "cogito, ergo sum", in a slightly different context than the one he originally intended, Aristotle would have agreed with Descartes's reasoning that a person/thinking thing is ontologically prior to the activity of thinking. So, in this case, a positive formulation would be that a thought requires a thinking thing, i.e., the thinking thing has ontological priority over their (or his/her) thought, whose existence depends on the former to exist. Conversely, the negative formulation is that thoughts cannot exist without a thinking thing.

One thing's ontological priority over another may be chronological, by reciprocally and non-reciprocally implied existence (i.e., a thing's nature), order, "esteem," or "truth-maker," depending on the formulation used.

== Ontological Priority in Aristotle's Categories ==
An ontological priority is an existential type of relationship, between two or more things, that occurs whenever a thing exists only because another thing exists; moreover, that existential relationship only becomes an ontological priority when at least one thing exists before (prior) another thing (posterior). Whereas if both things came to exist at the same time or bear no meaningful relationship (even if one came before the other), then an ontological priority cannot be said to occur.

With modal reasoning in mind, two of Aristotle's five ontological-priority formulations have it so that if the prior-existing thing were not to exist, then it would be impossible for the posterior-existing thing to exist (in the same way that five is the sum of two plus two is false in all possible worlds). These would be among the strongest forms of reasoning in philosophy and logic, since they carry the same certainty as analytic truths, and the denial of any one of them would result in an impossibility.

A "thing" can be a physical object/particular, idea/universal, or a tone/quality and can share an ontological/existential before-after relationship with any of the aforesaid three types of entities. But according to Aristotle, ideas/universals and tones/properties/qualities cannot exist without a particular/physical object; this means that it is impossible, according to Aristotle, for any universal or quality to be ontological prior to any physical object (see his fifth formulation in the subsection below), which was made clear in his arguments against Melissus, and his mentor, Parmenides, among others, in his first book of Physics (e.g., 185a29–b5), as well as other books throughout his Physics and Metaphysics.

If one suspected that the aforementioned trichotomy (viz., particulars, universals, and qualities) bears similarities to the type-token-tone framework of C. S. Peirce, a theorist who was not born until about 2,161 years after Aristotle's time, one would be correct. Aristotle's implicit understanding of this trichotomy is already quite evident by his first book of Physics, for example; he makes references and distinctions between the three abundantly. But these similarities between Peirce's trichotomy and Aristotle's implicit one may or may not coincidental. However, "trichotomy" is not the best description for it, since they are interrelated and, in all cases imaginable, inseparable; for example, the property of being a rational or thinking thing and the idea of bipedalism are inseparable from a particular man. (It is true that some persons lose the capacity for thought or the ability to walk, but these are two of many examples of particulars and ideas that are integrated with things, which helps understanding the perspective of how ontological priorities work.) For this reason, "triadic" would be a better term, since the three types of ontological phenomena are not mutually exclusive or an either/or. But triadic is a term that must be used with caution to avoid confusion with other ideas that also go by "triadic".

In Aristotle's terminology, this triadic relationship would have much to do with what he calls substance, essence, and accidental attributes, among other things, and according to Aristotle, universals (which are similar to his mentor Plato's Forms/Ideas) cannot be prior to substance, and accidental features (which are qualities, tones, or properties), such as the quality of whiteness (the example Aristotle uses many times against Melissus and Parmenides), cannot exist without substance either. Bear in mind that C. S. Peirce was influenced by Aristotle and was well-aware of Aristotle's use of particulars, universals, and qualities.

=== Aristotle's Five Formulations of Ontological Priorities ===
There are five ways, Aristotle states, that something is ontologically prior to something else, namely, time, reciprocity/non-reciprocity (or prior by nature), order, "esteem", and "truth-maker". (The last two are nicknames for the sake of keeping the two distinct from the other three Aristotle named.)

The first of Aristotle's five formulations of priority is time (which is the second easiest to understand in terms of its simplicity); for when one thinks about "priority", it is usually to do with the timewise sense in terms of "before" and "after" or Aristotle's prior and posterior. An example of a timewise ontological priority would be that of a father and son: Aristotle would say that the father is ontologically prior to the son because the father came to exist temporally before the son.

Reciprocity and non-reciprocity of implied existence (or prior by nature) are the second of Aristotle's formulations and are among the more difficult/complex of them all; the example Aristotle gives of a reciprocal/non-reciprocal ontological priority is through the example of numbers:

one is prior to two because if there are two then it follows at once that there is one whereas if there is one there are not necessarily two, so that the implication of the other's existence does not hold reciprocally from one. (14a30–35)

In Aristotle's second-formulation example, the existence of two implies (or "reciprocates the implication of") one's existence (and cannot fail to do so, unlike other formulations of the ontological priority, such as the fourth a little further below, "esteem"). But one does not reciprocate (hence, Aristotle's use of "non-reciprocate") the existence of two. Two cannot exist without one because two is two by virtue of being two units of one; whereas, by its own nature, one does not need two to exist because one is one unit, not two. Using the same reasoning between two and three, two would, then, become ontologically prior to three because three units reciprocally imply the existence of two units, but two does not reciprocate three (because it does not have three units), and so on. (If formulated properly, the second formulation is among the strongest forms of reasoning in philosophy.)

Order is Aristotle's third formulation of the ontological priority and is somewhat more or as complex as the previous one; a better way to understand this is the organization of something, be it science, speech, etc. Aristotle gives the example of grammar, wherein "the elements are prior to the syllables" (14b1–5). One can extrapolate from the example that words are, by order, ontologically prior to sentences and sentences to paragraphs, etc. Another of Aristotle's examples is, with speeches, the introduction comes before the exposition or explanation (14b1–5), and one can understand from there that the introduction and exposition are ontologically prior to the conclusion.

It is worth reiterating that formulations two (reciprocity and non-reciprocity or by nature) and three (order) are two of Aristotle's strongest formulations, which carry apodictic truth values; by contrast, their denial would result in a contradiction, causing impossibility. An example of formulations two and three are: three cannot fail to imply the existence of two because three is, by its nature, defined by its relationship to the numbers preceding it (i.e., bigger than one and two and comes after two), and a syllable cannot exist without its elements, even under modal realism (that is, in all possible worlds, there exist none in which three units do not imply the units of two, for example, which makes these sorts priorities necessarily true). Whereas no such examples are possible in the first formulation (i.e., time) and the fourth, just below.

While "esteem" is not Aristotle's name for the fourth formulation, he provides none for it. He suggests that it is "perhaps the least proper" of all other formulations because has more to do with how someone esteems themselves or persons they love/admire as ontologically prior to other persons (14b1–5). This formulation starkly contrasts the more substantive formulations of the three other ontological priorities described above.

Aristotle describes the fourth formulation of the ontological priority as "what is better and more valued is thought to be prior by nature: ordinary people commonly say of those they specially value and love that they 'have priority'" (14b5–10). Aristotle's mention of "by nature" implies that the second formulation of the ontological priority (e.g., three is greater than two and reciprocally implies the existence of two) is being misunderstood by people who esteem others, by placing them prior to others by nature; this is so that this aspect of formulation four does not get confused with formulation two. As understandable as it would be that a mother's love for her child, for example, would have her place him as "prior" to other children who are not her own, either by nature (i.e., what the child is) or thought (i.e., what the mother thinks), this form of ontological priority is arbitrary (i.e., what the child is) and opinion-driven (i.e., what the mother thinks), and it is the simplest among all the formulations. As we saw with Aristotle's comment of this formulation being perhaps the least proper, it is made clear by him that he regards this form of ontological reasoning with disdain.

"Truth-maker" is the fifth and last of Aristotle's formulations of what ontological priorities are, and, as a comprehension heuristic, one could think of it in terms of Alfred Tarski's "x makes it true that p". Alternatively, one may think of the similarities between this formulation and the correspondence theory of truth. As a word of caution: these ideas are not the same, but they have remarkable parallels. Furthermore, the Tarski truth-maker formula and the correspondence theory of truth roughly represent half of Aristotle's formulation; the other half goes above and beyond the truth-making and extends into ontology and the cause of a thing's existence, which is what makes it an ontological priority in the first place.

Before going further, the fifth formulation, dubbed "truth-maker" for naming convenience, is the most complex of them all and is a variation of the second of Aristotle's formulations (reciprocity and non-reciprocity or by nature). But although its certainty is not as high as the second and third formulations, it is stronger than the fourth formulation and either on par with the first, i.e., priority by time, or slightly weaker in terms of certainty. Whatever problems the correspondence theory of truth and Tarski's formula have, the fifth formulation is likewise affected by their problems.

Aristotle gives the example of his fifth formulation of a man and a proposition about him:

if there is a man, the statement whereby we say that there is a man is true, there is a man. And whereas the true statement is in no way the cause of the actual thing's existence, the actual thing does seem in some way the cause of the statement's being true: it is because the actual thing exists or does not that the statement is called true or false. (14b15–20)

In this example, Aristotle, makes it clear that a physical object referenced by a statement cannot be posterior to it; this is related (but not quite equivalent) to Aristotle's belief, against Plato's substantive and independently existing Forms/Ideas, that the only reality universals have is with their instantiations in particulars. For example, suppose the universal of bipedality (bipedalism) is instantiated in one thing and that thing is the only man who exists; if that man would be destroyed or lose that accidental feature of his being (i.e., being able to walk on two legs), then the universal would cease to be, at least, until another the universal is instantiated once more. This example illustrates Aristotle's belief that physical objects are ontologically prior to non-physical objects, as with his example of a man being prior to a statement about him. Thus, the statement "There is a man in this house" is true only if there is a man in the house. But the said statement cannot make it so that a man appears out of nowhere in the house so that the statement makes itself true, which is why Aristotle's fifth formulation treats physical objects and other elements that are decisive of bivalent propositions' truth values as their truth-maker, similar to Tarski's formula that "x makes it true that p": the man makes "there is a man" true. But it is worth noting, once again, Aristotle does not explicitly call them "truth-makers"; he strongly emphasizes that particulars determine the truth and falsity of statements, and not the other way around. An example of "other elements" can be a number in "Eight is a number," which is evidently not a statement about a particular but has a non-physical thing as its truth-maker, and this is an area that Aristotle makes no mention or distinctions of, regarding the difference between particulars from ideas/universals and properties/qualities/tones as truth-makers.

Last, Aristotle explained that this formulation, which was dubbed "truth-maker" for clarity, is an expansion, or is a variation, of the second formulation of reciprocity and non-reciprocity of implied existence (or by nature); this is to say that, in Aristotle's man-statement example, "For there being a man reciprocates as to implication of existence with the true statement about it [him]" (14b10–15). But the statement itself is non-reciprocal in that respect; it cannot reciprocally imply the existence of a man on its own. That is, the statement "there is a man" does not necessarily mean a man exists, whereas a man implies the existence of the statement "there is a man." The similarities between the correspondence theory of truth and Aristotle's fifth formula is that both involve "matching" a statement with a truth-maker, a "correspondence, hence the theory's name; however, where the two ideas differ is that Aristotle holds truth-makers to be ontologically prior (in the fifth sense) to statements.

Although formulation four is quite controversial, for the presumption (i.e., "thought") that persons are prior or posterior to each other is determined in part "by nature" (not to be confused with formulation two) is often exemplified in racism, formulation five is quite controversial in philosophy because it leaves open-ended questions with respect to anti-realism or scepticism, depending on whether statements are existentially caused by truth-makers (hence, anti-realism with respect to language) or whether statements are only caused to be true per se, thus, opening up the door as to whether the correspondence between "there is a man" and the physical man was dreamt, imagined, hallucinated, mistaken, etc., hence, the problem of realism-scepticism.

== Contemporary Models of Ontological Priority ==
=== Dependence Model ===
The most ubiquitous model is the dependence model of ontological priority which states that "A is prior to B" is true just in case B depends on A for its existence, as in the case where the color of a particular being depends on that being existing for the color-quality inhering in it to exist. An entity ontologically depends on another entity if the first entity cannot exist without the second entity. Ontologically independent entities, on the other hand, can exist all by themselves. For example, the surface of an apple cannot exist without the apple and so depends on it ontologically. Entities often characterized as ontologically dependent include properties, which depend on their bearers, and boundaries, which depend on the entity they demarcate from its surroundings.

=== "More Real" Model ===
A model of ontological priority was developed by Justus Buchler in order to criticize it:

Let us contrast a principle of ontological priority ... with a principle of ontological parity. In terms of the latter, whatever is discriminated in any way ... is a natural complex, and no complex is more 'real', more 'natural', more 'genuine', or more 'ultimate' than any other.

This model states for something A to have ontological priority over something B, it is sufficient that A be more real than B. Thus, for a Platonist, the Forms are ontologically prior to sensible beings.

=== Strawson's Model ===
P. F. Strawson holds that one type of particulars is ontological prior to another type of particulars if we cannot talk about the first type without referring to the second type. In Strawson's own ontology, physical objects are prior to all other particulars.

=== Jack Abaza's Model of Epistemic Priority ===
Using Aristotle's second formulation of ontological priorities with respect to the meaning of life, Abaza claims that "a question's meaning comes prior to its answer," which is why related inquiries concerning significance and purpose (e.g., "what is the meaning of life?" and "what is the purpose of life?") in the philosophy of life should be treated as separate and distinct from each other, since the former is ontologically prior to the latter. Otherwise, answering a question whose meaning is unknown would not only be a blind guess, but it would be impossible to know whether the answer to it is relevant, much less true or not. If true in the unlikeliest of circumstances, such an answer would be ungeneralizable anyway, much less justified.

The second reason why a question's meaning is ontologically prior to its answer is shown through his example of volleyball, wherein knowing what the leathery volleyball is for presumes knowing already what it is, i.e., a ball with a certain weight and diameter that can be thrown. But it would be question-begging for one to know how to play a game of volleyball (i.e., the leathery ball's purpose) without knowing what the leathery ball or the game is (i.e., significance or meaning); hence, similarly, there is a linguistic knowledge requirement (or constraint) where it is not humanly possible to meaningfully answer "what is the meaning of life?" without literally knowing the meaning of the meaning of life. Because the meaning of life is singular, which bars answers claiming that there is more than one meaning, and because it has a definite article, the phrase must reference a single meaning, and without its literal meaning, an interpreter would fail the knowledge requirement, making the literal meaning of the meaning of life impossible to answer because it cannot be understood. Thus, the ontological priority of a question's meaning coming prior to its answer, and the epistemic priority of a person's understanding of a question's meaning prior to the act of answering it, makes it impossible for the meaning of life to imply anything other than its own literal meaning.

== Related concepts ==
=== Truthmakers ===
Truthmakers are entities that make a proposition true. For example, a dog being spotted makes the proposition "The dog is spotted" true. In such a relation, the truth of the proposition depends on the dogs being in a certain way for it to be true.

=== Substance ===
Substances are generally understood to be things that do not depend on other things in order to exist. For example, in Aristotle's Categories, these are individuals, as individuals do not depend on their accidents in order to exist, while accidents do need their individuals in order to exist.

=== Grounding ===
Grounding concerns in virtue of what else a proposition holds or some kind of thing is the way it is. This is articulated in the case of the Euthyphro dilemma. In the Euthyphro dialogue, Socrates asks Euthyphro, "Is the pious (Ancient Greek: τὸ ὅσιον) loved by the gods because it is pious, or is it pious because it is loved by the gods?" (10a). Epistemological foundationalists are similarly concerned with what propositions ground other propositions in the order of knowledge.
