= Electron interferometer =

An electron interferometer is generates interference with the wave function of electrons to make measurements.

== Overview ==
Interferometry uses the principal of superposition to make measurements. The electron wave-packet is split into a superposition of two paths. Small differences in the paths will create a phase difference between each portion of the electron superposition. Interfering both halves of the superposition will then create an interference fringe. Measuring this fringe provides a quantifiable means to characterize the interaction strength. Since electrons are charged, they repel each other, thus rendering the theoretical analysis more difficult than for uncharged sources like, e.g., neutrons or atoms. To obtain high precision the de Broglie wavelength needs to be small, which again favors neutrons or (heavy) atoms since they have a higher mass. Therefore, many high precision experiments now deploy atom interferometers based on the Sagnac effect.

== See also ==
- Atom interferometer
