= Double-slit experiment =

Physics experiment

Photons or matter (like electrons) produce an interference pattern when two slits are used.

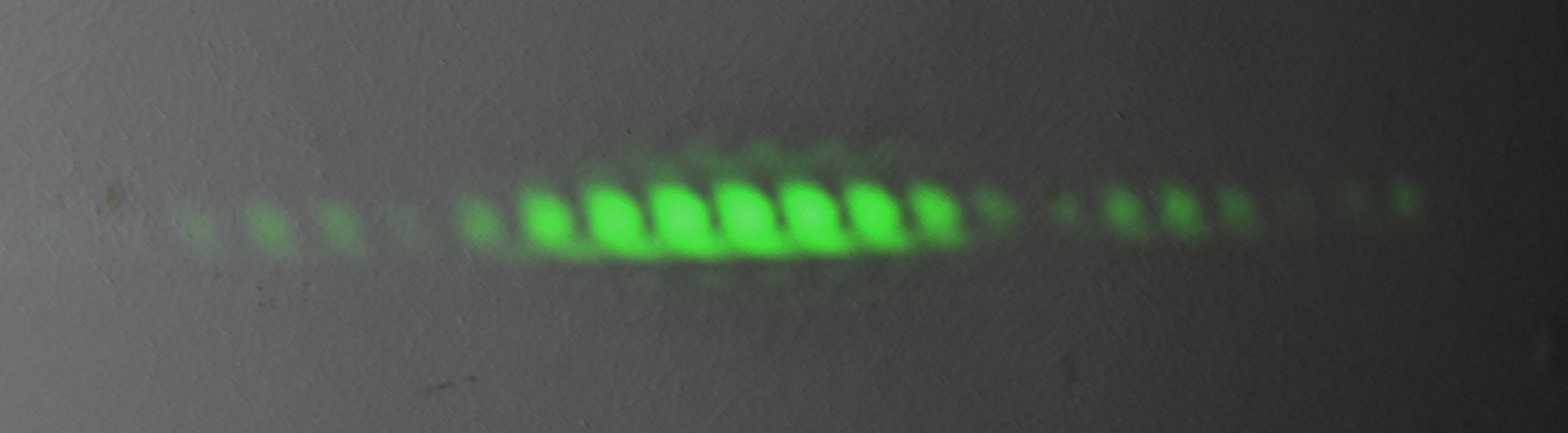
Light from a green laser passing through two slits 0.1 millimeter wide and 0.4 millimeter apart

In modern physics, the double-slit experiment demonstrates that light and matter can exhibit behavior associated with both classical particles and classical waves. This type of experiment was first described by Thomas Young in 1801 when making his case for the wave behavior of visible light. In 1927, Davisson and Germer and, independently, George Paget Thomson and his research student Alexander Reid demonstrated that electrons show the same behavior, which was later extended to atoms and molecules.

The experiment belongs to a general class of "double path" experiments, in which two diffracted waves reconverge, creating an interference pattern. Another version is the Mach–Zehnder interferometer, which splits the beam with a beam splitter.

In the basic version of this experiment, a coherent light source, such as a laser beam, illuminates a plate pierced by two parallel slits, and the light passing through the slits is observed on a screen behind the plate. The wave nature of light causes the light waves passing through the two slits to interfere, producing bright and dark bands on the screen – a result that would not be expected if light consisted of classical particles. However, the light is always found to be absorbed at the screen at discrete points, as individual particles (not waves); the interference pattern appears via the varying density of these particle hits on the screen. Furthermore, versions of the experiment that include detectors at the slits find that each detected photon passes through one slit (as would a classical particle), and not through both slits (as would a wave). However, such experiments demonstrate that particles do not form the double-slit interference pattern if one detects which slit they pass through; the pattern instead becomes the sum of two single-slit interference patterns. These results demonstrate the principle of wave–particle duality.

Other atomic-scale entities, such as electrons, are found to exhibit the same behavior when fired towards a double slit. Additionally, the detection of individual discrete impacts is observed to be inherently probabilistic, which is inexplicable using classical mechanics.

The experiment can be done with entities much larger than electrons and photons, although it becomes more difficult as size increases. Among the larger objects which the double-slit experiment has been performed were molecules that each comprised 2000 atoms (whose total mass was 25,000 daltons) and nanoparticles composed of 5000-10000 sodium atoms.

The double-slit experiment (and its variations) has become a classic for its clarity in expressing the central puzzles of quantum mechanics. Richard Feynman called it "a phenomenon which is impossible […] to explain in any classical way, and which has in it the heart of quantum mechanics. In reality, it contains the only mystery [of quantum mechanics]."

== Overview ==
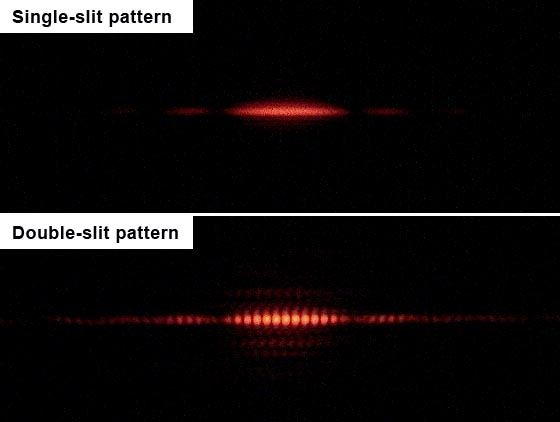
Same double-slit assembly (0.7 mm between slits); in top image, one slit is closed. In the single-slit image, a diffraction pattern (the faint spots on either side of the main band) forms due to the nonzero width of the slit. This diffraction pattern is also seen in the double-slit image, but with many smaller interference fringes.

If one illuminates two parallel slits, the light from the two slits again interferes. Here the interference is a more pronounced pattern with a series of alternating light and dark bands. The width of the bands is a property of the frequency of the illuminating light. (See the bottom photograph to the right.)

If light consisted strictly of ordinary or classical particles, and these particles were fired in a straight line through a slit and allowed to strike a screen on the other side, we would expect to see a pattern corresponding to the size and shape of the slit. However, when this "single-slit experiment" is actually performed, the pattern on the screen is a diffraction pattern in which the light is spread out. The smaller the slit, the greater the angle of spread. The top portion of the image shows the central portion of the pattern formed when a red laser illuminates a slit and, if one looks carefully, two faint side bands. More bands can be seen with a more highly refined apparatus. The wave theory of light explains the pattern as being the result of the interference of light waves from the slit.

Feynman was fond of saying that all of quantum mechanics can be gleaned from carefully thinking through the implications of this single experiment. He also proposed (as a thought experiment) that if detectors were placed before each slit, the interference pattern would disappear.

== History ==
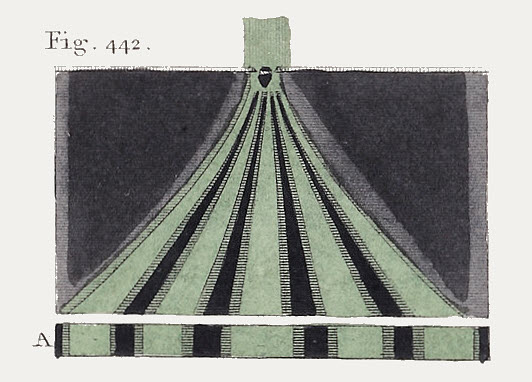
Fig. 442 in an 1807 book about Young's lectures with a caption by Young that reads: “the manner in which two portions of coloured light, admitted through two small apertures, produce light and dark stripes or fringes by their interference.”

In 1801, Thomas Young presented a famous paper to the Royal Society entitled "On the Theory of Light and Colours" which explained interference phenomena like Newton's rings in terms of wave interference. The first published account of what Young called his 'general law' of interference appeared in January 1802, in his book A Syllabus of a Course of Lectures on Natural and Experimental Philosophy:

But the general law, by which all these appearances are governed, may be very easily deduced from the interference of two coincident undulations, which either cooperate, or destroy each other, in the same manner as two musical notes produce an alternate intension and remission, in the beating of an imperfect unison.

In 1803, Young followed up with demonstrations of optical interference using sunlight, pinholes and cards. These demonstrations played a crucial role in the understanding of the wave theory of light, challenging the corpuscular theory of light proposed by Isaac Newton, which had been the accepted model of light propagation in the 17th and 18th centuries. As part of his discussion of these experiments he describes a double slit experiment. There is some question as to whether he ever actually performed a double-slit interference experiment. Later discovery of the photoelectric effect demonstrated that under different circumstances, light can behave as if it is composed of discrete particles. These seemingly contradictory discoveries, now called wave-particle duality, made it necessary to go beyond classical physics and take into account the quantum nature of light.

A low-intensity double-slit experiment was first performed by G. I. Taylor in 1909, by reducing the level of incident light until photon emission/absorption events were mostly non-overlapping. A slit interference experiment was not performed with anything other than light until 1961, when Claus Jönsson of the University of Tübingen performed it with coherent electron beams and multiple slits. In 1974, the Italian physicists Pier Giorgio Merli, Gian Franco Missiroli, and Giulio Pozzi performed a related experiment using single electrons from a coherent source and a biprism beam splitter, showing the statistical nature of the buildup of the interference pattern, as predicted by quantum theory. In 2002, the single-electron version of the experiment was voted "the most beautiful experiment" by readers of Physics World. Since that time a number of related experiments have been published, with a little controversy.

In 2012, Stefano Frabboni and co-workers sent single electrons onto nanofabricated slits (about 100 nm wide) and, by detecting the transmitted electrons with a single-electron detector, they could show the build-up of a double-slit interference pattern. Many related experiments involving the coherent interference have been performed; they are the basis of modern electron diffraction, microscopy and high resolution imaging.

In 2018, single particle interference was demonstrated for antimatter in the Positron Laboratory (L-NESS, Politecnico di Milano) of Rafael Ferragut in Como (Italy), by a group led by Marco Giammarchi.

== Variations of the experiment ==
=== Interference from individual particles ===
An important version of this experiment involves single particle detection. Illuminating the double-slit with a low intensity results in single particles being detected as white dots on the screen. Remarkably, however, an interference pattern emerges when these particles are allowed to build up one by one (see the image below).

Experimental electron double-slit diffraction pattern

Final result of dot-by-dot build up of diffraction. Across the middle of the image, the intensity alternates from high to low, showing interference in the signal from the two slits.

Movie of the pattern being built up dot by dot. Click to enlarge.

This demonstrates the wave–particle duality, which states that all matter exhibits both wave and particle properties: The particle is measured as a single pulse at a single position, while the modulus squared of the wave describes the probability of detecting the particle at a specific place on the screen giving a statistical interference pattern. This phenomenon has been shown to occur with photons, electrons, atoms, and even some molecules: with buckminsterfullerene (C_{60}) in 2002, with 2 molecules of 430 atoms (C_{60}(C_{12}F_{25})_{10} and C_{168}H_{94}F_{152}O_{8}N_{4}S_{4}) in 2011, and with molecules of up to 2000 atoms in 2019. In addition to interference patterns built up from single particles, up to 4 entangled photons can also show interference patterns.

=== Mach–Zehnder interferometer ===
Light in Mach–Zehnder interferometer produces interference (wave-like behavior) even when being detected one photon at a time (particle-like behavior).

The Mach–Zehnder interferometer can be seen as a simplified version of the double-slit experiment. Instead of propagating through free space after the two slits, and hitting any position in an extended screen, in the interferometer the photons can only propagate via two paths, and hit two discrete photodetectors. This makes it possible to describe it via simple linear algebra in dimension 2, rather than differential equations.

A photon emitted by the laser hits the first beam splitter and is then in a superposition between the two possible paths. In the second beam splitter these paths interfere, causing the photon to hit the photodetector on the right with probability one, and the photodetector on the bottom with probability zero. Blocking one of the paths, or equivalently detecting the presence of a photon on a path eliminates interference between the paths: both photodetectors will be hit with probability 1/2. This indicates that after the first beam splitter the photon does not take one path or another, but rather exists in a quantum superposition of the two paths.

=== "Which-way" experiments and the principle of complementarity ===
A well-known thought experiment predicts that if particle detectors are positioned at the slits, showing through which slit a photon goes, the interference pattern will disappear. This which-way experiment illustrates the complementarity principle that photons can behave as either particles or waves, but cannot be observed as both at the same time. Despite the importance of this thought experiment in the history of quantum mechanics (for example, see the discussion on Einstein's version of this experiment), technically feasible realizations of this experiment were not proposed until the 1970s. (Naive implementations of the textbook thought experiment are not possible because photons cannot be detected without absorbing the photon.) Currently, multiple experiments have been performed illustrating various aspects of complementarity.

An experiment performed in 1987 produced results that demonstrated that partial information could be obtained regarding which path a particle had taken without destroying the interference altogether. This "wave-particle trade-off" takes the form of an inequality relating the visibility of the interference pattern and the distinguishability of the which-way paths.

=== Delayed choice and quantum eraser variations ===
A diagram of Wheeler's delayed choice experiment, showing the principle of determining the path of the photon after it passes through the slit

Wheeler's delayed-choice experiments demonstrate that extracting "which path" information after a particle passes through the slits can seem to retroactively alter its previous behavior at the slits.

Quantum eraser experiments demonstrate that wave behavior can be restored by erasing or otherwise making permanently unavailable the "which path" information.

A simple do-it-at-home illustration of the quantum eraser phenomenon was given in an article in Scientific American. If one sets polarizers before each slit with their axes orthogonal to each other, the interference pattern will be eliminated. The polarizers can be considered as introducing which-path information to each beam. Introducing a third polarizer in front of the detector with an axis of 45° relative to the other polarizers "erases" this information, allowing the interference pattern to reappear. This can also be accounted for by considering the light to be a classical wave, and also when using circular polarizers and single photons. Implementations of the polarizers using entangled photon pairs have no classical explanation.

=== Weak measurement ===
In a highly publicized experiment in 2012, researchers claimed to have identified the path each particle had taken without any adverse effects at all on the interference pattern generated by the particles. In order to do this, they used a setup such that particles coming to the screen were not from a point-like source, but from a source with two intensity maxima. However, commentators such as Svensson have pointed out that there is in fact no conflict between the weak measurements performed in this variant of the double-slit experiment and the Heisenberg uncertainty principle. Weak measurement followed by post-selection did not allow simultaneous position and momentum measurements for each individual particle, but rather allowed measurement of the average trajectory of the particles that arrived at different positions. In other words, the experimenters were creating a statistical map of the full trajectory landscape.

=== Other variations ===
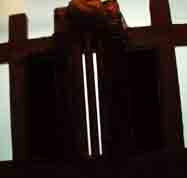
A laboratory double-slit assembly; distance between top posts is approximately 2.5 cm (one inch).

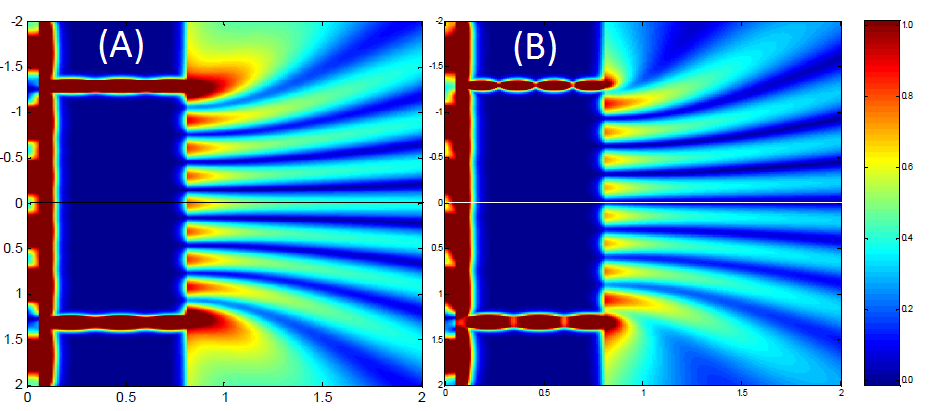
Near-field intensity distribution patterns for plasmonic slits with equal widths (A) and non-equal widths (B)

In 1967, Pfleegor and Mandel demonstrated two-source interference using two separate lasers as light sources.

It was shown experimentally in 1972 that in a double-slit system where only one slit was open at any time, interference was nonetheless observed provided the path difference was such that the detected photon could have come from either slit. The experimental conditions were such that the photon density in the system was much less than 1.

In 1991, Carnal and Mlynek performed the classic Young's double slit experiment with metastable helium atoms passing through micrometer-scale slits in gold foil.

In 1999, a quantum interference experiment (using a diffraction grating, rather than two slits) was successfully performed with buckyball molecules (each of which comprises 60 carbon atoms). A buckyball is large enough (diameter about 0.7 nm, nearly half a million times larger than a proton) to be seen in an electron microscope.

In 2002, an electron field emission source was used to demonstrate the double-slit experiment. In this experiment, a coherent electron wave was emitted from two closely located emission sites on the needle apex, which acted as double slits, splitting the wave into two coherent electron waves in a vacuum. The interference pattern between the two electron waves could then be observed. In 2017, researchers performed the double-slit experiment using light-induced field electron emitters. With this technique, emission sites can be optically selected on a scale of ten nanometers. By selectively deactivating (closing) one of the two emissions (slits), researchers were able to show that the interference pattern disappeared.

In 2005, E. R. Eliel presented an experimental and theoretical study of the optical transmission of a thin metal screen perforated by two subwavelength slits, separated by many optical wavelengths. The total intensity of the far-field double-slit pattern is shown to be reduced or enhanced as a function of the wavelength of the incident light beam.

In 2012, researchers at the University of Nebraska–Lincoln performed the double-slit experiment with electrons as described by Richard Feynman, using new instruments that allowed control of the transmission of the two slits and the monitoring of single-electron detection events. Electrons were fired by an electron gun and passed through one or two slits of 62 nm wide × 4 μm tall.

In 2013, a quantum interference experiment (using diffraction gratings, rather than two slits) was successfully performed with molecules that each comprised 810 atoms (whose total mass was over 10,000 daltons). The record was raised to 2000 atoms (25,000 amu) in 2019.

In 2025, scientists at the Massachusetts Institute of Technology performed a version of the double-slit experiment using atoms trapped in an optical lattice and forming a Mott insulator. After being released from the optical lattice these ultra-cold atoms have Heisenberg uncertainty limited momentum and position. Single photons initially scatter from the atoms coherently and form optical interference pattern. As the wavepackets of the released atoms expand, the interference pattern disappears, confirming incoherent scattering. The experiment demonstrates wave interference using only quantum atoms and photons.

In 2026, a group at the University of Vienna performed an interference experiment involving sodium nanoparticles with masses exceeding 170 kDa. Their experiment used standing waves formed by ultraviolet lasers as a diffraction grating.

==== Hydrodynamic pilot wave analogs ====
Hydrodynamic analogs have been developed that can recreate various aspects of quantum mechanical systems, including single-particle interference through a double-slit. A silicone oil droplet, bouncing along the surface of a liquid, self-propels via resonant interactions with its own wave field. The droplet gently sloshes the liquid with every bounce. At the same time, ripples from past bounces affect its course. The droplet's interaction with its own ripples, which form what is known as a pilot wave, causes it to exhibit behaviors previously thought to be peculiar to elementary particles – including behaviors customarily taken as evidence that elementary particles are spread through space like waves, without any specific location, until they are measured.

Behaviors mimicked via this hydrodynamic pilot-wave system include quantum single particle diffraction, tunneling, quantized orbits, orbital level splitting, spin, and multimodal statistics. It is also possible to infer uncertainty relations and exclusion principles. Videos are available illustrating various features of this system. (See the External links.)

However, more complicated systems that involve two or more particles in superposition are not amenable to such a simple, classically intuitive explanation. Accordingly, no hydrodynamic analog of entanglement has been developed. Nevertheless, optical analogs are possible.

==== Double-slit experiment on time ====
In 2023, an experiment was reported recreating an interference pattern in time by shining a pump laser pulse at a screen coated in indium tin oxide (ITO) which would alter the properties of the electrons within the material due to the Kerr effect, changing it from transparent to reflective for around 200 femtoseconds long where a subsequent probe laser beam hitting the ITO screen would then see this temporary change in optical properties as a slit in time and two of them as a double slit with a phase difference adding up destructively or constructively on each frequency component resulting in an interference pattern. Similar results have been obtained classically on water waves.

== Classical wave-optics formulation ==
Two-slit diffraction pattern with an incident plane wave

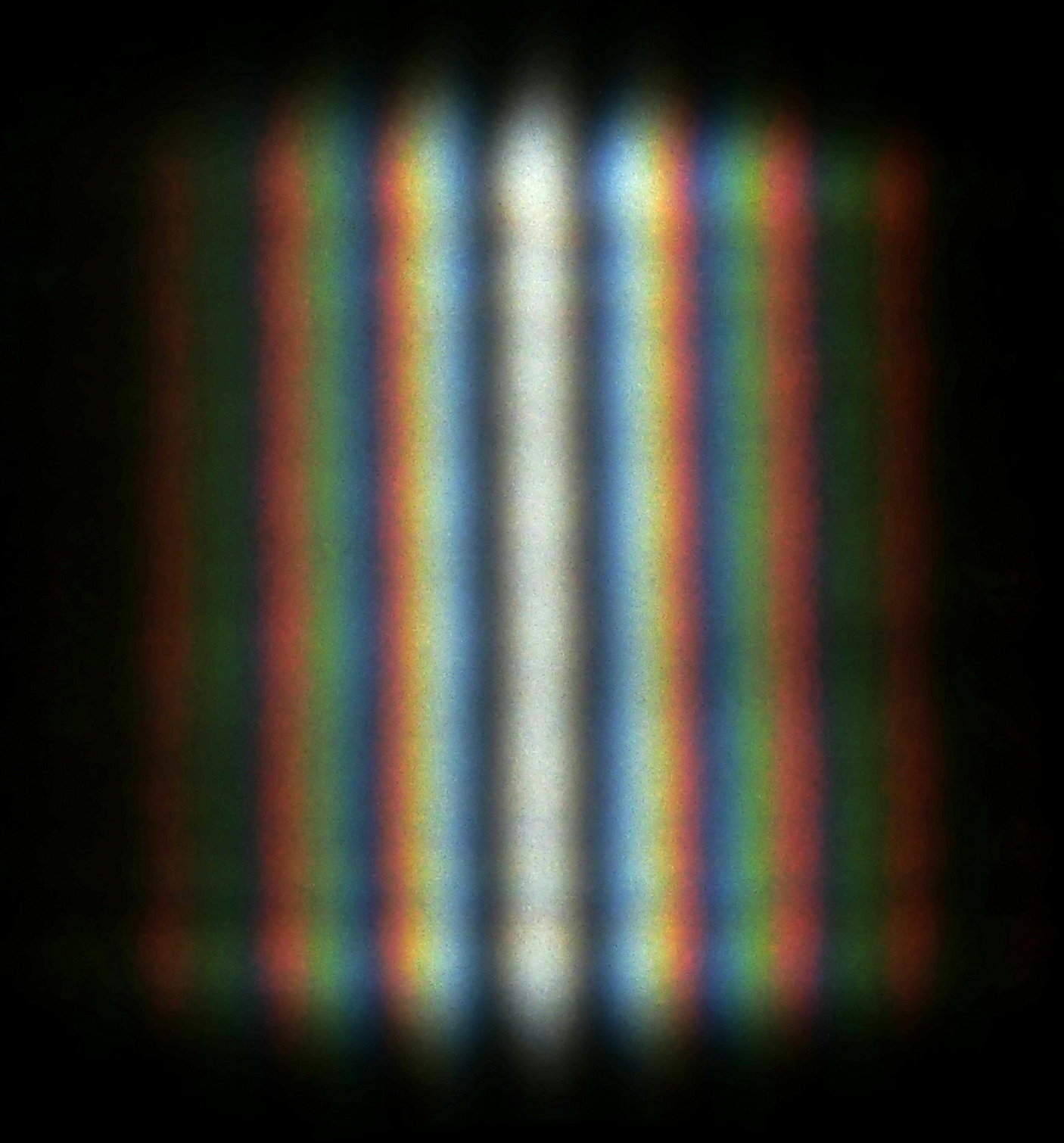
Photo of the double-slit interference of sunlight

Two slits are illuminated by a plane wave, showing the path difference.

Much of the behaviour of light can be modelled using classical wave theory. The Huygens–Fresnel principle is one such model; it states that each point on a wavefront generates a secondary wavelet, and that the disturbance at any subsequent point can be found by summing the contributions of the individual wavelets at that point. This summation needs to take into account the phase as well as the amplitude of the individual wavelets. Only the intensity of a light field can be measured—this is proportional to the square of the amplitude.

In the double-slit experiment, the two slits are illuminated by the quasi-monochromatic light of a single laser. If the width of the slits is small enough (much less than the wavelength of the laser light), the slits diffract the light into cylindrical waves. These two cylindrical wavefronts are superimposed, and the amplitude, and therefore the intensity, at any point in the combined wavefronts depends on both the magnitude and the phase of the two wavefronts. The difference in phase between the two waves is determined by the difference in the distance travelled by the two waves.

If the viewing distance is large compared with the separation of the slits (the far field), the phase difference can be found using the geometry shown in the figure below right. The path difference between two waves travelling at an angle θ is given by:
$$d \sin \theta \approx d \theta$$
where d is the distance between the two slits. When the two waves are in phase, i.e. the path difference is equal to an integral number of wavelengths, the summed amplitude, and therefore the summed intensity is maximum, and when they are in anti-phase, i.e. the path difference is equal to half a wavelength, one and a half wavelengths, etc., then the two waves cancel and the summed intensity is zero. This effect is known as interference. The interference fringe maxima occur at angles
$$d \theta_n = n \lambda,~ n=0,1,2,\ldots$$
where λ is the wavelength of the light. The angular spacing of the fringes, θ_{f}, is given by
$$\theta_f \approx \lambda / d$$

The spacing of the fringes at a distance z from the slits is given by
$$~w=z \theta_f = z \lambda /d$$

For example, if two slits are separated by 0.5 mm (d), and are illuminated with a 0.6 μm wavelength laser (λ), then at a distance of 1 m (z), the spacing of the fringes will be 1.2 mm.

If the width of the slits b is appreciable compared to the wavelength, the Fraunhofer diffraction equation is needed to determine the intensity of the diffracted light as follows:
$$\begin{align}
I(\theta)
&\propto  \cos^2 \left [{\frac {\pi d \sin \theta}{\lambda}}\right]~\mathrm{sinc}^2 \left [ \frac {\pi b \sin \theta}{\lambda} \right]
\end{align}$$
where the sinc function is defined as sinc(x) = sin(x)/x for x ≠ 0, and sinc(0) = 1.

This is illustrated in the figure above, where the first pattern is the diffraction pattern of a single slit, given by the sinc function in this equation, and the second figure shows the combined intensity of the light diffracted from the two slits, where the cos function represents the fine structure, and the coarser structure represents diffraction by the individual slits as described by the sinc function.

Similar calculations for the near field can be made by applying the Fresnel diffraction equation, which implies that as the plane of observation gets closer to the plane in which the slits are located, the diffraction patterns associated with each slit decrease in size, so that the area in which interference occurs is reduced, and may vanish altogether when there is no overlap in the two diffracted patterns.

== Path-integral formulation ==
The double-slit experiment can illustrate the path integral formulation of quantum mechanics provided by Feynman. The path integral formulation replaces the classical notion of a single, unique trajectory for a system, with a sum over all possible trajectories. The trajectories are added together by using functional integration.

Each path is considered equally likely, and thus contributes the same amount. However, the phase of this contribution at any given point along the path is determined by the action along the path:
$$A_{\text{path}}(x,y,z,t) = e^{i S(x,y,z,t)}$$

All these contributions are then added together, and the magnitude of the final result is squared, to get the probability distribution for the position of a particle:
$$p(x,y,z,t) \propto \left\vert \int_{\text{all paths}} e^{i S(x,y,z,t)} \right\vert ^2$$

As is always the case when calculating probability, the results must then be normalized by imposing:
$$\iiint_{\text{all space}}p(x,y,z,t)\,dV = 1$$

The probability distribution of the outcome is the normalized square of the norm of the superposition, over all paths from the point of origin to the final point, of waves propagating proportionally to the action along each path. The differences in the cumulative action along the different paths (and thus the relative phases of the contributions) produces the interference pattern observed by the double-slit experiment. Feynman stressed that his formulation is merely a mathematical description, not an attempt to describe a real process that we can measure.

== Interpretations of the experiment ==
Like the Schrödinger's cat thought experiment, the double-slit experiment is often used to highlight the differences and similarities between the various interpretations of quantum mechanics.

=== Standard quantum physics ===
The standard interpretation of the double slit experiment is that the pattern is a wave phenomenon, representing interference between two probability amplitudes, one for each slit. Low intensity experiments demonstrate that the pattern is filled in one particle detection at a time. Any change to the apparatus designed to detect a particle at a particular slit alters the probability amplitudes and the interference disappears. This interpretation is independent of any conscious observer.

=== Complementarity ===
Niels Bohr interpreted quantum experiments like the double-slit experiment using the concept of complementarity. In Bohr's view quantum systems are not classical, but measurements can only give classical results. Certain pairs of classical properties will never be observed in a quantum system simultaneously: the interference pattern of waves in the double slit experiment will disappear if particles are detected at the slits. Modern quantitative versions of the concept allow for a continuous tradeoff between the visibility of the interference fringes and the probability of particle detection at a slit.

=== Copenhagen interpretation ===
The Copenhagen interpretation is a collection of views about the meaning of quantum mechanics, stemming from the work of Niels Bohr, Werner Heisenberg, Max Born, and others. The term "Copenhagen interpretation" was apparently coined by Heisenberg during the 1950s to refer to ideas developed in the 1925–1927 period, glossing over his disagreements with Bohr. Consequently, there is no definitive historical statement of what the interpretation entails. Features common across versions of the Copenhagen interpretation include the idea that quantum mechanics is intrinsically indeterministic, with probabilities calculated using the Born rule, and some form of complementarity principle. Moreover, the act of "observing" or "measuring" an object is irreversible, and no truth can be attributed to an object, except according to the results of its measurement. In the Copenhagen interpretation, complementarity means a particular experiment can demonstrate particle behavior (passing through a definite slit) or wave behavior (interference), but not both at the same time. In a Copenhagen-type view, the question of which slit a particle travels through has no meaning when there is no detector.

=== Relational interpretation ===
According to the relational interpretation of quantum mechanics, first proposed by Carlo Rovelli, observations such as those in the double-slit experiment result specifically from the interaction between the observer (measuring device) and the object being observed (physically interacted with), not any absolute property possessed by the object. In the case of an electron, if it is initially "observed" at a particular slit, then the observer–particle (photon–electron) interaction includes information about the electron's position. This partially constrains the particle's eventual location at the screen. If it is "observed" (measured with a photon) not at a particular slit but rather at the screen, then there is no "which path" information as part of the interaction, so the electron's "observed" position on the screen is determined strictly by its probability function. This makes the resulting pattern on the screen the same as if each individual electron had passed through both slits.

=== Many-worlds interpretation ===
As with Copenhagen, there are multiple variants of the many-worlds interpretation. The unifying theme is that physical reality is identified with a wavefunction, and this wavefunction always evolves unitarily, i.e., following the Schrödinger equation with no collapses. Consequently, there are many parallel universes, which only interact with each other through interference. David Deutsch argues that the way to understand the double-slit experiment is that in each universe the particle travels through a specific slit, but its motion is affected by interference with particles in other universes, and this interference creates the observable fringes. David Wallace, another advocate of the many-worlds interpretation, writes that in the familiar setup of the double-slit experiment the two paths are not sufficiently separated for a description in terms of parallel universes to make sense.

=== De Broglie–Bohm theory ===
An alternative to the standard understanding of quantum mechanics, the De Broglie–Bohm theory states that particles also have precise locations at all times, and that their velocities are defined by the wave-function. So while a single particle will travel through one particular slit in the double-slit experiment, the so-called "pilot wave" that influences it will travel through both. The two slit de Broglie–Bohm trajectories were first calculated by Chris Dewdney while working with Chris Philippidis and Basil Hiley at Birkbeck College (London). Despite being deterministic, the de Broglie–Bohm theory produces the same statistical results as standard quantum mechanics under the "quantum equilibrium hypothesis", which requires the initially prepared particle positions to be randomly distributed according to the modulus squared of the initially prepared wave function. Although de Broglie–Bohm theory overcomes many of the conceptual difficulties of quantum mechanics in the non-relativistic setting, it is incompatible with Lorentz invariance.

Bohmian trajectories

Trajectories of particles in De Broglie–Bohm theory in the double-slit experiment

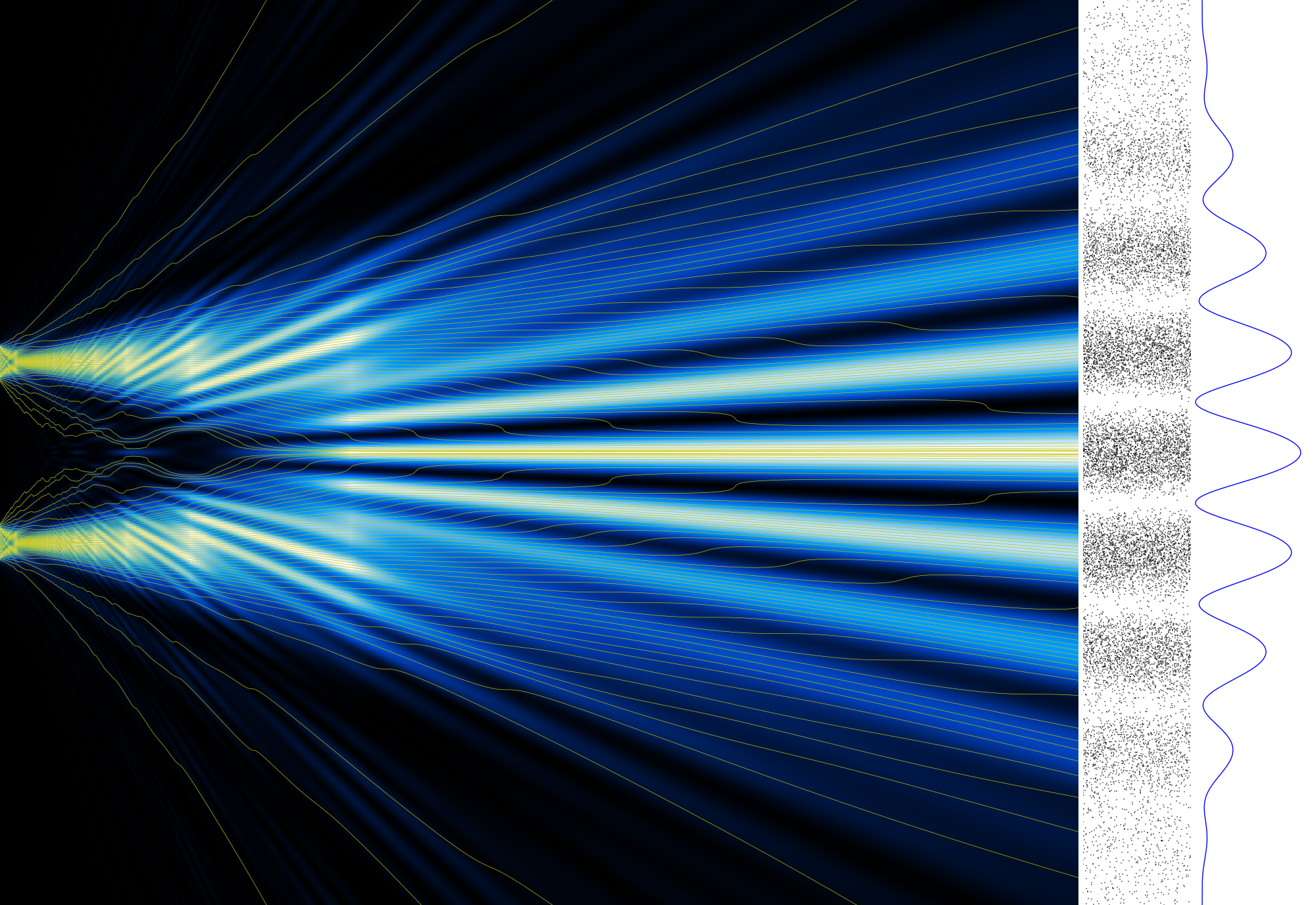
100 trajectories guided by the wave function. In De Broglie–Bohm's theory, a particle is represented, at any time, by a wave function and a position (center of mass). This is a kind of augmented reality compared to the standard interpretation.

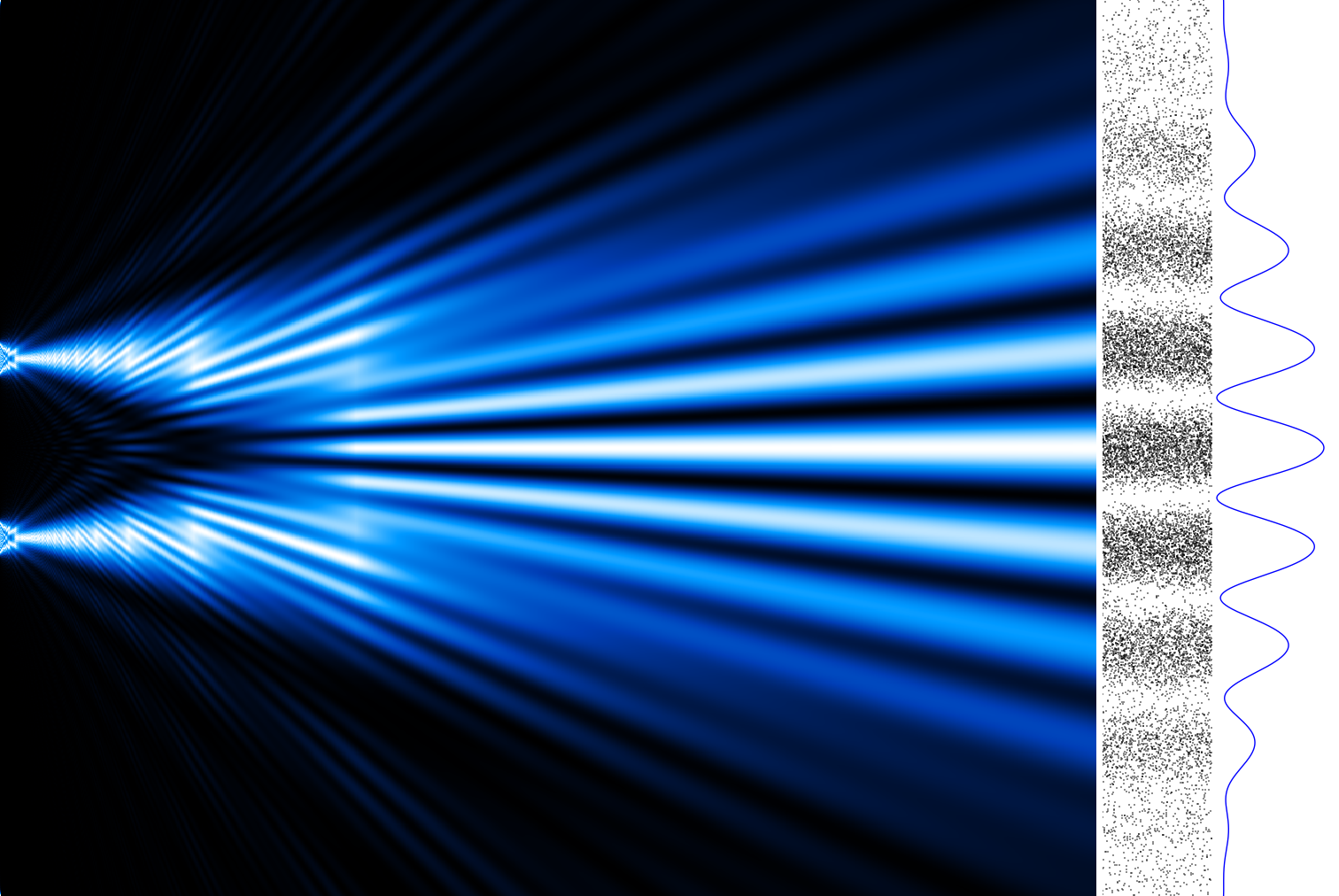
Numerical simulation of the double-slit experiment with electrons. Figure on the left: evolution (from left to right) of the intensity of the electron beam at the exit of the slits (left) up to the detection screen located 10 cm after the slits (right). The higher the intensity, the more the color is light blue – Figure in the center: impacts of the electrons observed on the screen – Figure on the right: intensity of the electrons in the far field approximation (on the screen). Numerical data from Claus Jönsson's experiment (1961). Photons, atoms and molecules follow a similar evolution.

== See also ==
- Aharonov–Bohm effect
- Complementarity (physics)
- Delayed-choice quantum eraser
- Diffraction from slits
- Dual-polarization interferometry
- Elitzur–Vaidman bomb tester
- N-slit interferometer
- Matter wave
- Photon polarization
- Quantum coherence
- Schrödinger's cat
- Young's interference experiment
- Measurement problem
- Hydrodynamic quantum analogs
- Pilot wave theory
