= Electron holography =

Holography of electron waves

Electron holography is holography with electron matter waves. It was invented by Dennis Gabor in 1948 when he tried to improve image resolution in an electron microscope. The first attempts to perform holography with electron waves were made by Haine and Mulvey in 1952; they recorded holograms of zinc oxide crystals with 60 keV electrons, demonstrating reconstructions with approximately 1 nm resolution. In 1955, G. Möllenstedt and H. Düker invented an electron biprism, thus enabling the recording of electron holograms in an off-axis scheme. There are many different possible configurations for electron holography, with more than 20 documented in 1992 by Cowley. Usually, high spatial and temporal coherence (i.e. a low energy spread) of the electron beam is required to perform holographic measurements.

== High-energy electron holography in off-axis scheme ==
Electron holography with high-energy electrons (80-200 keV) can be realized in a transmission electron microscope (TEM) in an off-axis scheme. The electron beam is split into two parts by a paper-thin positively charged wire. Positive voltage deflects the electron waves so that they overlap and produce an interference pattern of equidistantly spaced fringes.

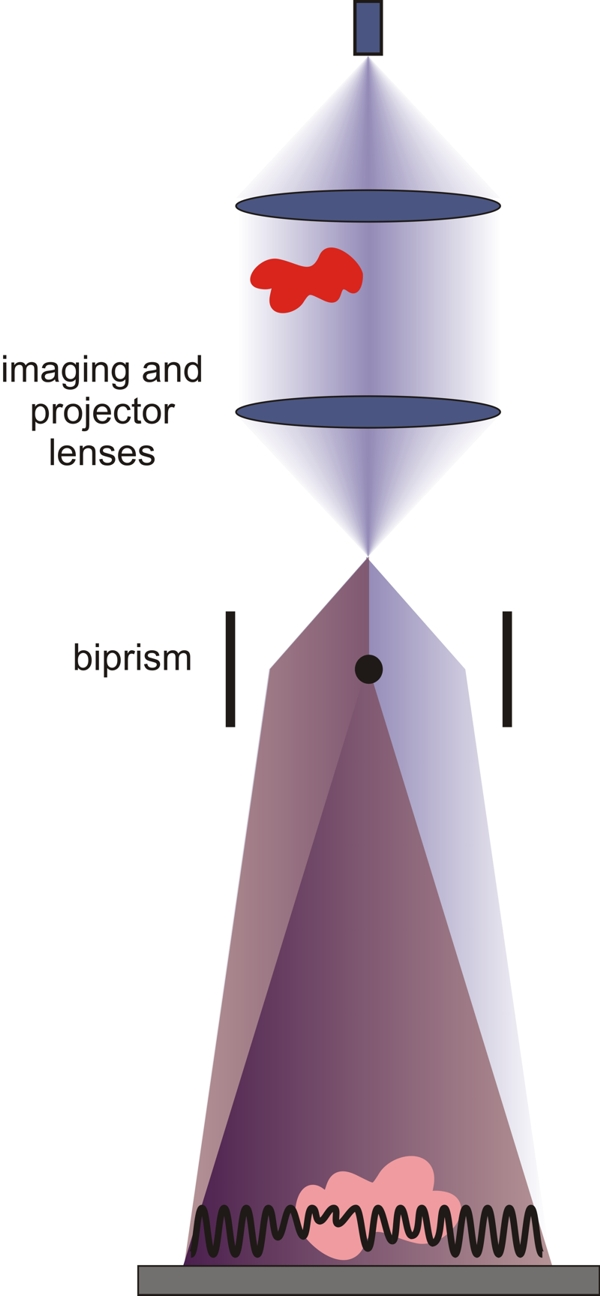
An illustration of off-axis electron holography in a transmission electron microscope.

Reconstruction of off-axis holograms is done numerically. and it consists of two mathematical transformations. First, a Fourier transform of the hologram is performed. The resulting complex image consists of the autocorrelation (center band) and two mutually conjugated sidebands. Only one side-band is selected by applying a low-pass filter (round mask) centered on the chosen side-band. The central band and the twin side-band are both set to zero. Next, the selected side-band is re-positioned to the center of the complex image and the backward Fourier-transform is applied. The resulting image in the object domain is complex-valued, and thus, the amplitude and phase distributions of the object function are reconstructed.

== Electron holography in in-line scheme ==
The original holographic scheme by Dennis Gabor is an inline scheme, which means that reference and object wave share the same optical axis. This scheme is also called point projection holography. An object is placed into divergent electron beam, part of the wave is scattered by the object (object wave) and it interferes with the unscattered wave (reference wave) the detector plane. The spatial coherence in the in-line scheme is defined by the size of the electron source. Holography with low-energy electrons (50-1000 eV) can be realized in in-line scheme.

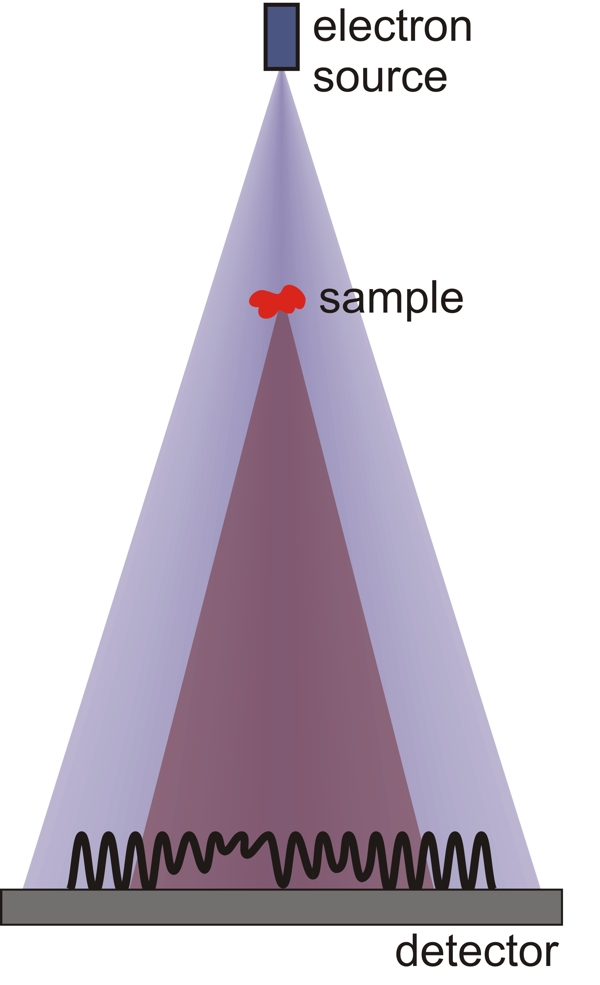
Inline electron holography scheme.

== Electromagnetic fields ==
It is important to shield the interferometric system from electromagnetic fields, as they can induce unwanted phase-shifts due to the Aharonov–Bohm effect. Static fields will result in a fixed shift of the interference pattern. It is clear every component and sample must be properly grounded and shielded from outside noise.

== Applications ==
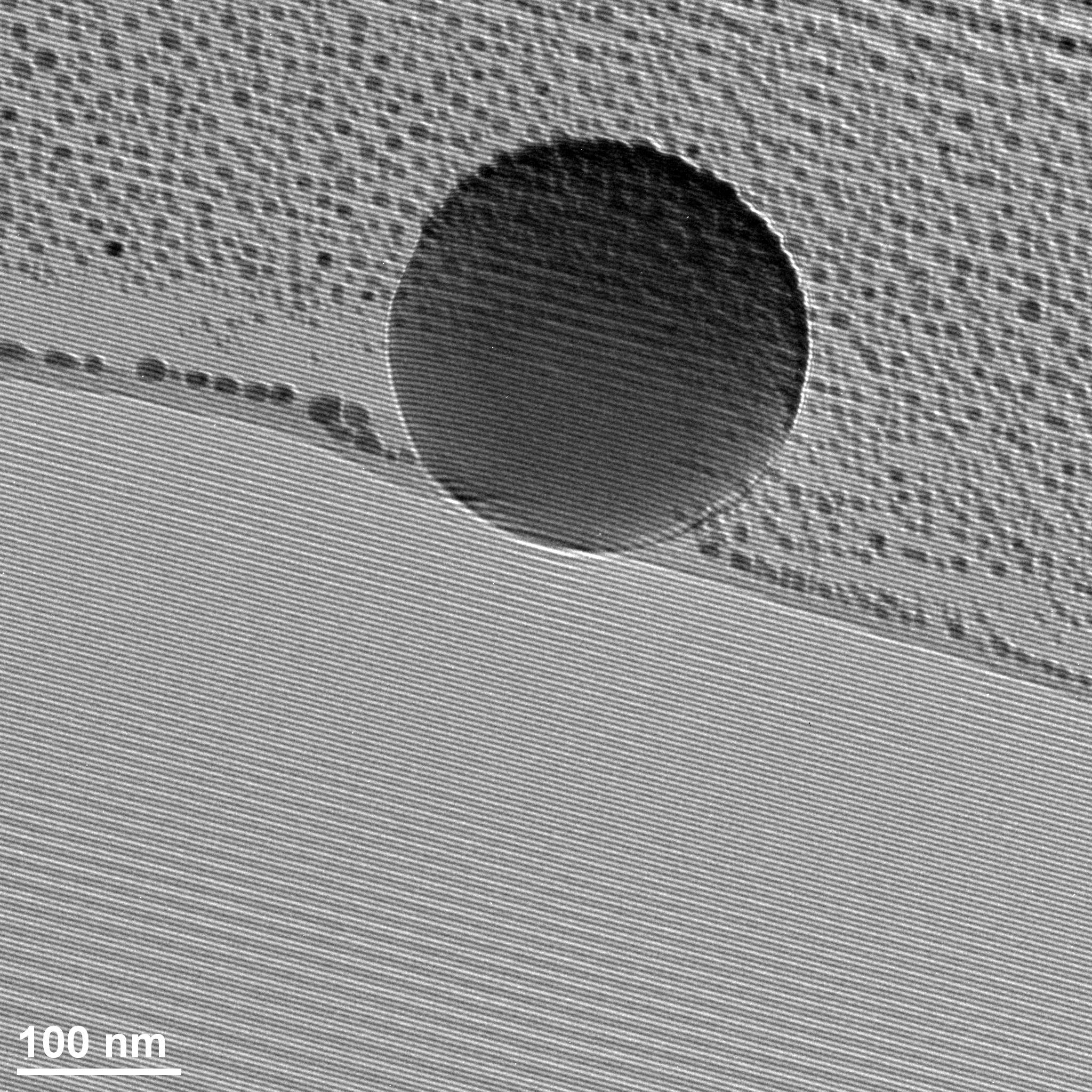
At this image one can see the electron hologram of a latex sphere on a carbon coating with gold particles (black dots), at the lower part of the image is vacuum. The biprism is approx above the vacuum edge; parallel to this edge one can see the phase planes of the interferogram, which is part of the image and from which the phase information can be extracted.

Electron holography is commonly used to study electric and magnetic fields in thin films, as magnetic and electric fields can shift the phase of the interfering wave passing through the sample.

The principle of electron holography can also be applied to interference lithography.
