= Ivy Hooks =

Mathematician and engineer

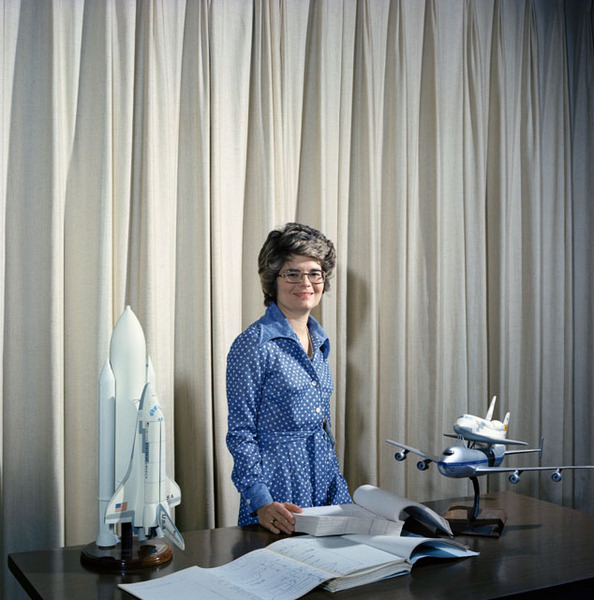
- Born: November 17, 1941; Houston, Texas, US
- Died: March 23, 2026 (aged 84)
- Education: University of Houston (BS, MS)
- Occupation: Engineer: National Aeronautics and Space Administration
- Awards: Arthur S. Flemming Award (1978); NASA Exceptional Service Medal (1981)

Ivy Fay Hooks (November 17, 1941 - March 23, 2026) was an American mathematician and engineer who worked for the National Aeronautics and Space Administration (NASA). She joined NASA after graduating from the University of Houston with a master's degree in mathematics and physics in 1965. Her first assignment was with the Apollo program, where she worked on the modeling of lighting on the Moon and the dynamics of the launch escape system, among other projects. She then went on to play an important role in the design and development of the Space Shuttle, being one of only two women engineers assigned to the original design team for the orbiter.

== Early life and education ==
Ivy Fay Hooks was born in Houston, Texas, on November 17, 1941, and grew up in Livingston, Texas. She was named after Ivy Parker, one of the founding members of the Society of Women Engineers, and a close friend of her parents. She graduated from Livingston High School and entered Southwestern University in Georgetown, Texas, where she studied mathematics. In June after her first year, she got married, and moved to Lufkin, Texas, where her husband was a reporter for a local newspaper. She then went to Austin College. She entered the University of Houston in her junior year. There, she also became interested in physics. She earned a Bachelor of Science degree in mathematics in 1963.

== NASA career ==
=== Project Apollo ===
Jobs for women with mathematics degrees were not common in the early 1960s, and she did not want to become a teacher, so she went to graduate school, where she worked towards her master's degree. A friend's mother drew her attention to an article in the newspaper that said "NASA's looking for women scientists and engineers." When she went for an interview at the Manned Spaceflight Center, she was unimpressed with the building, which was a disused box factory with no windows, and the people, who she thought were strange. However, she met a woman whose husband worked at NASA and was looking for people. A second interview was arranged, and this job was more to her liking. She was hired as an "aerospace technologist", which annoyed some of the engineers who had the same job classification.

Hook's first assignment was modeling lighting on the Moon. This was of great importance at the time, as it was vital to know what the view would look like when astronauts attempted to land the lunar module. Most engineers were not much interested; it was not something on the college syllabus. She found that the subject had been researched by Russian physicists in the 1920s, who were interested in the lunar albedo, and they had created a full mathematical treatment of the subject. There were very few women working for NASA at the time in technical roles, and the men often played cruel practical jokes. She became fed up with the behavior of two of the men in her group, and decided to switch to another. She went to work for Humboldt C. Mandell, Jr., who was working on developing cost models. These were projections far into the future. She returned to the University of Houston, where she completed her studies, and was awarded a Master of Science degree in mathematics in 1965.

Hooks studied the dynamics of the launch escape system, and the effects of jet plumes coming from the Lunar Module's ascent propulsion system and descent propulsion system. She also investigated the dynamics of the Apollo flight systems.

=== Space Shuttle ===
In April 1969 she became one of two women engineers assigned to the original design team for the Space Shuttle Orbiter. She recalled that Max Faget walked into the room carrying a balsa wood model airplane and declared; "We’re going to build America’s next spacecraft. And it’s going to launch like a spacecraft, it’s going to land like a plane." Hooks studied various configurations for such a spacecraft. She was particularly involved with the analysis and management of the mechanism for the separation of the Space Shuttle Orbiter from the Shuttle Carrier Aircraft for the Approach and Landing Tests. Another area in which Hooks made a significant contribution was the means by which the Space Shuttle Solid Rocket Boosters separated from the Space Shuttle external tank. For her work on the design of the Space Shuttle, Hooks received the Arthur S. Flemming Award in 1978, and the NASA Exceptional Service Medal in 1981.

=== Software ===
Foreseeing that computers would become more important, Hooks headed the Aerodynamics Systems Analysis Section of the Aerodynamics Branch in the Engineering Analysis Division from 1973 to 1977. She headed the Spacecraft Software Division in Data Systems and Analysis Directorate from 1978 to 1980, and was the Software Manager in the Spacecraft Software Division in the Data Systems and Analysis Directorate from 1980 to 1981. She was manager of the Shuttle Data Office in the Space Shuttle Program Office from 1981 to 1982, acting head of the Integration and Operations Section, Flight Software Branch in the Spacecraft Software Division from 1982 to 1983, and Chief of the Flight Software Branch of Spacecraft Software Division in the Mission Support Directorate from 1982 to 1984.

== Later life ==
Hooks left NASA in 1984, and joined Barrios Technology, an aerospace contractor. In 1986 she became President and Chief Executive Officer of Bruce G. Jackson and Associates. She later founded her own software company, Compliance Automation.
