= Tara Fortier =

Canadian physicist

Tara Michele Fortier
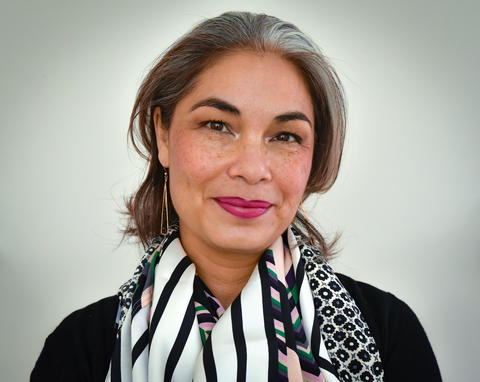
- Fortier in 2022, NIST official photo
- Education: Concordia University; JILA
- Scientific career
- Workplaces: Los Alamos National Laboratory; National Institute of Standards and Technology; University of Colorado at Boulder
- Thesis: Phase-stabilized modellocked lasers : from optical frequency metrology to waveform synthesis of ultrashort pulses (2004)

Tara Michele Fortier is a Canadian physicist and Project Leader in the Time and Frequency Division at National Institute of Standards and Technology. Her research considers precision optical and microwave metrology. She was elected Fellow of the American Physical Society in 2022 and awarded the SPIE Harold E. Edgerton Award in High-Speed Optics in 2023.

== Early life and education ==
Fortier attended Concordia University as an undergraduate student, where she majored in physics and graduated summa cum laude in 1998. Fortier was a doctoral researcher at JILA, where she developed pulsed laser systems for precision measurements. Her postdoctoral work involved a joint position between National Institute of Standards and Technology and Los Alamos National Laboratory, where she searched for violations of Einstein's laws.

== Research and career ==
Fortier was made a Project Leader at National Institute of Standards and Technology, where she develops optical and microwave metrology. In particular, Fortier uses phase stabilised mode-locked lasers to synthesise stable optical signals for optical clocks.

Her efforts to create optical clocks have contributed to more accurate measurements of the second. Optical clocks use atoms (e.g. ytterbium and strontium) that oscillate at very high frequencies. Her team at NIST used eight hydrogen masers to keep time when the optical clock could not function. They achieved a ytterbium-based optical clock that only lost 100 seconds over the age of the universe.

== Awards and honours ==
- 2004 Los Alamos National Laboratory Postdoctoral Director's Fellowship
- 2008 European Frequency and Time Forum Young Scientist Award
- 2014 Outstanding Paper from IEEE Ultrasonics, Ferroelectrics and Frequency Control Society
- 2017 and 2019 NIST Outstanding Associate Award
- 2021 Optica Fellow
- 2021 Department of Commerce Bronze Medal
- 2021 NIST-PML Excellence in Diversity, Equity, and Inclusion Award
- 2021 NIST Diversity, Inclusivity and Equal Employment Opportunity Award
- 2022 American Physical Society Fellow
- 2023 SPIE Harold E. Edgerton Award in High-Speed Optics

== Select publications ==
- T Rosenband; D B Hume; P O Schmidt; et al. (6 March 2008). "Frequency ratio of Al+ and Hg+ single-ion optical clocks; metrology at the 17th decimal place". Science. 319 (5871): 1808–1812. doi:10.1126/science.1154622. ISSN 0036-8075. PMID 18323415. Wikidata Q34759219.
- T. M. Fortier; M. S. Kirchner; F. Quinlan; et al. (26 June 2011). "Generation of ultrastable microwaves via optical frequency division". Nature Photonics. 5 (7): 425–429. arXiv:1101.3616. doi:10.1038/nphoton.2011.121. ISSN 1749-4885. Wikidata Q59473807.
- A D Ludlow; T Zelevinsky; G K Campbell; et al. (14 February 2008). "Sr lattice clock at 1 x 10(-16) fractional uncertainty by remote optical evaluation with a Ca clock". Science. 319 (5871): 1805–1808. arXiv:0801.4344. Bibcode:2008Sci...319.1805L. doi:10.1126/science.1153341. ISSN 0036-8075. PMID 18276849. Wikidata Q39834721.
