= Arthur S. Flemming Award =

Award for U.S. federal employees

The Arthur S. Flemming Award is an award given annually to employees of the United States federal government. More than 500 individuals have received the award since it was created in 1948. The Trachtenberg School of Public Policy and Public Administration at George Washington University administers the award. A nomination requires the person to be a federal employee for at least three years and for less than fifteen years. Every year, twelve awards are given in five different categories: Leadership and/or Management, Legal Achievement, Social Science, Clinical Trials and Translational Research, Applied Science and Engineering, and Basic Science.

Federal agencies nominate public servants who meet the nomination requirements. Previously nominated individuals include Gretchen Campbell for accomplishments in the emerging field of atomtronics; and Fern Hunt for a sustained record of contributions to probability, stochastic modelling, and other fields.

The awards are given to the annual winners at George Washington University through its Trachtenberg School of Public Policy and Public Administration, which, since 1997, has worked in partnership with the Arthur S. Flemming Awards Commission.

== History ==
In 1948, Arthur Sherwood Flemming was the guest speaker at a meeting of the Downtown Jaycees in Washington, D.C., in the federal service. Flemming challenged the Jaycees to come up with a way to give 'recognition' to the younger employee.

Several weeks later, the Jaycees gave Flemming a proposal for an awards program with an upper age limit of 40, with the award named after Flemming. Flemming approved the awards program.

== Noted recipients ==
(Non exhaustive list)

- Jean Apgar
- Neil Armstrong
- David A. Bray
- Samuel Broder
- Gretchen Campbell
- George R. Carruthers
- John Chancellor
- Francis S. Collins
- Sen. Elizabeth Dole
- Joseph T. English
- Anthony Fauci
- Deborah S. Jin
- Robert Gates
- Jun Ye
- Bruce Herschensohn
- Ivy Hooks
- Robert Hormats
- Fern Hunt
- Sherwood B. Idso
- George Khoury
- Kent Kresa
- Rep. Howard Mosby
- Sen. Daniel Patrick Moynihan
- Elaine Surick Oran
- Christa Peters-Lidard
- William Daniel Phillips
- Paul Volcker, Jr.
- Welcome W. Wilson, Sr.
