= Limbers and caissons =

Two-wheeled cart for carrying ammunition, or supporting the trail of an artillery piece

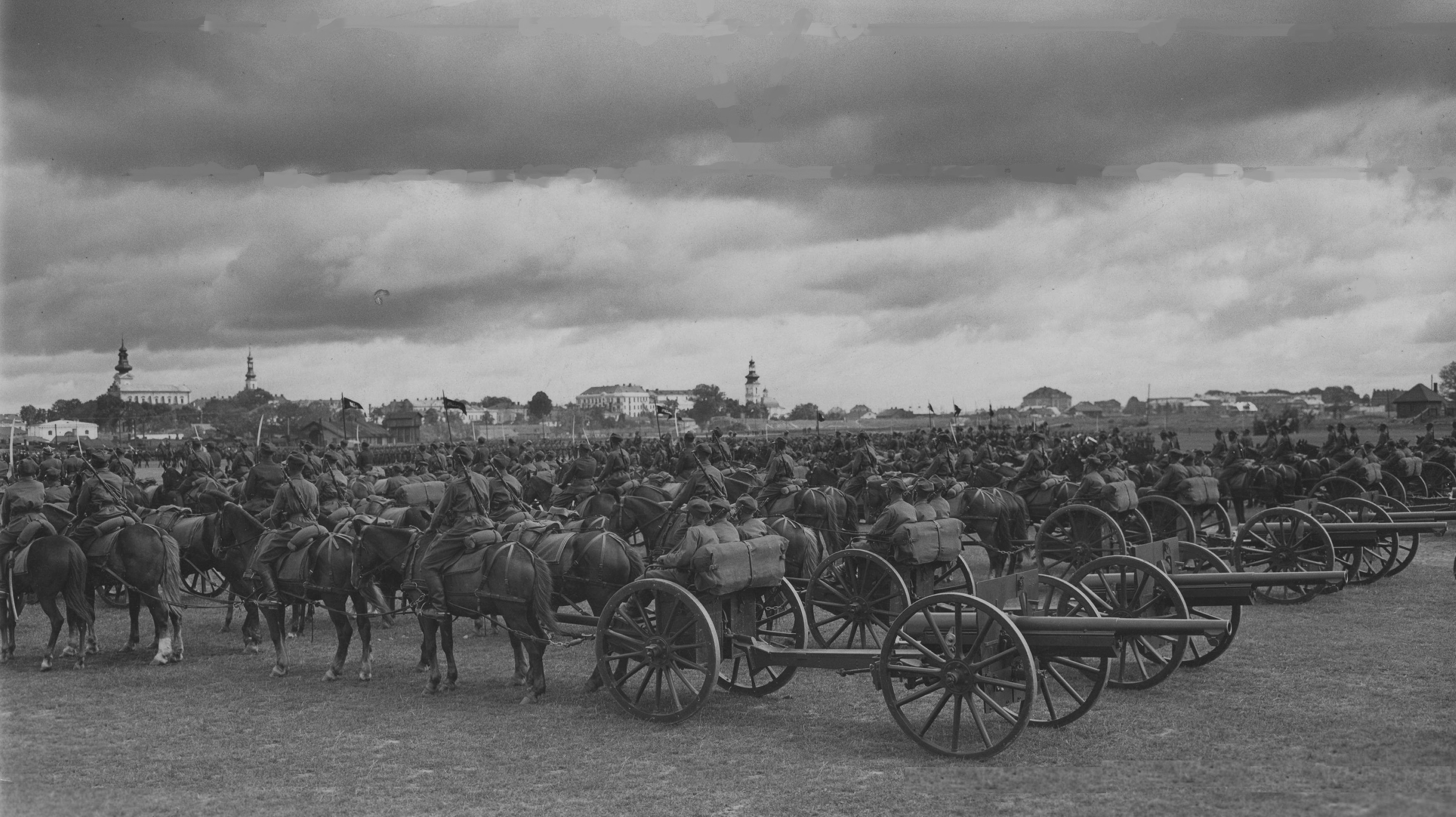
Horse artillery—rows of limbers and guns, each pulled by a team of six horses with three postilion riders and an escort on horseback (1933, Poland)

A limber is a two-wheeled cart designed to support the trail of an artillery piece, or the stock of a field carriage such as a caisson or traveling forge, allowing it to be towed. The trail is the hinder end of the stock of a gun-carriage, which rests or slides on the ground when the carriage is unlimbered.

A caisson (US: /ˈkeɪsɒn/) is a two-wheeled cart designed to carry artillery ammunition; the British term is "ammunition wagon".

Caissons are also used to bear the casket of the deceased in some state and military funerals in certain Western cultures, including the United States.

== Before the 19th century ==
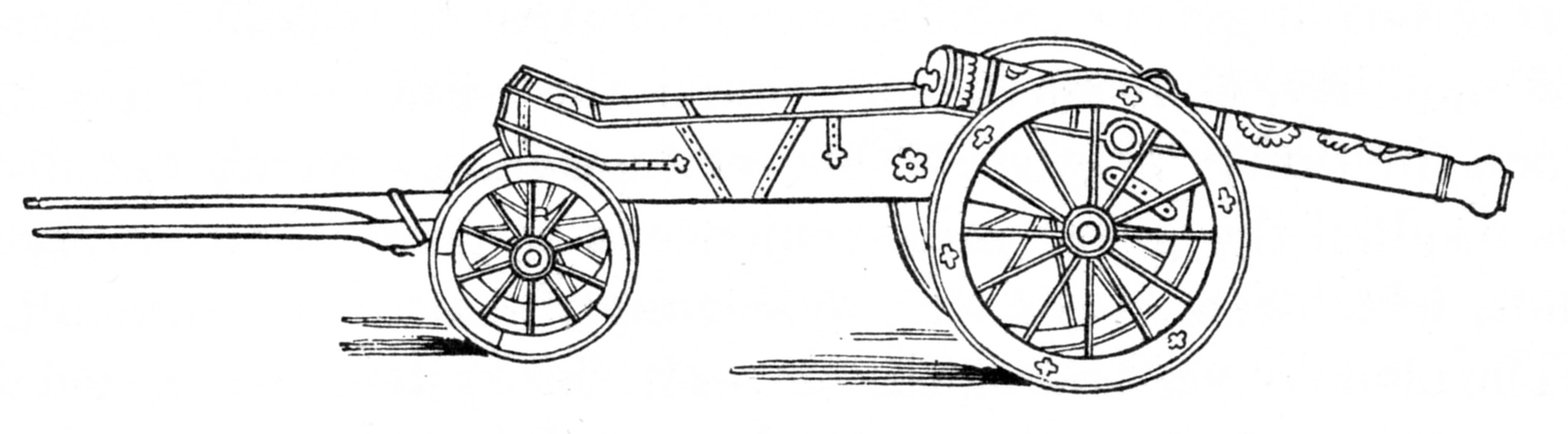
Limber (left) and gun, c. 1461

As artillery pieces developed trunnions and were placed on carriages featuring two wheels and a trail, a limber was devised. This was a simple cart with a pintle. When the piece was to be towed, it was raised over the limber and then lowered, with the pintle fitting into a hole in the trail. Horses or other draft animals were harnessed in single file to haul the limber. There was no provision for carrying ammunition on the limber, but an ammunition chest was often carried between the two pieces of the trail.

== 19th century ==
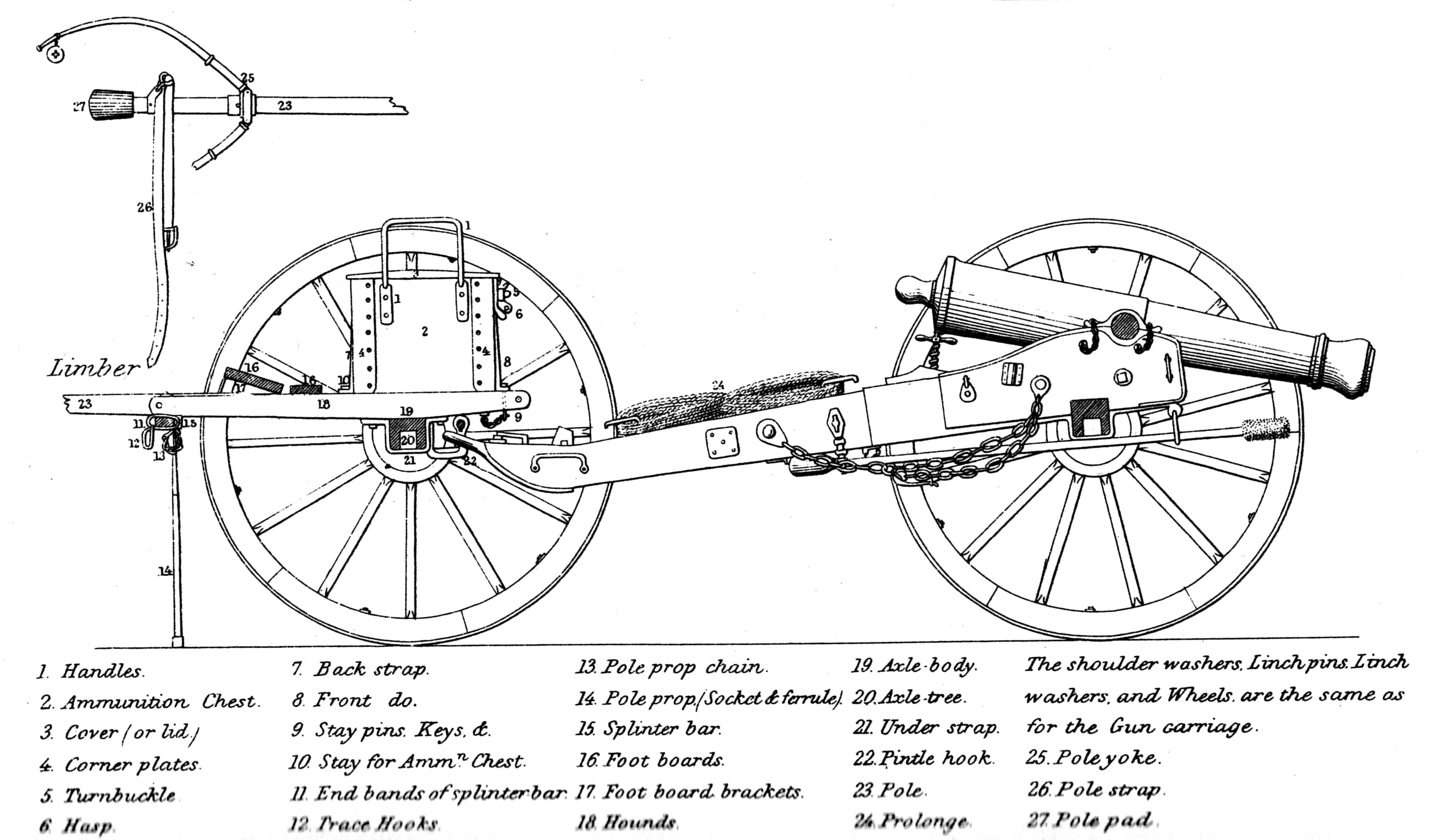
Limber (left) and field gun, c. 1864 (side view)

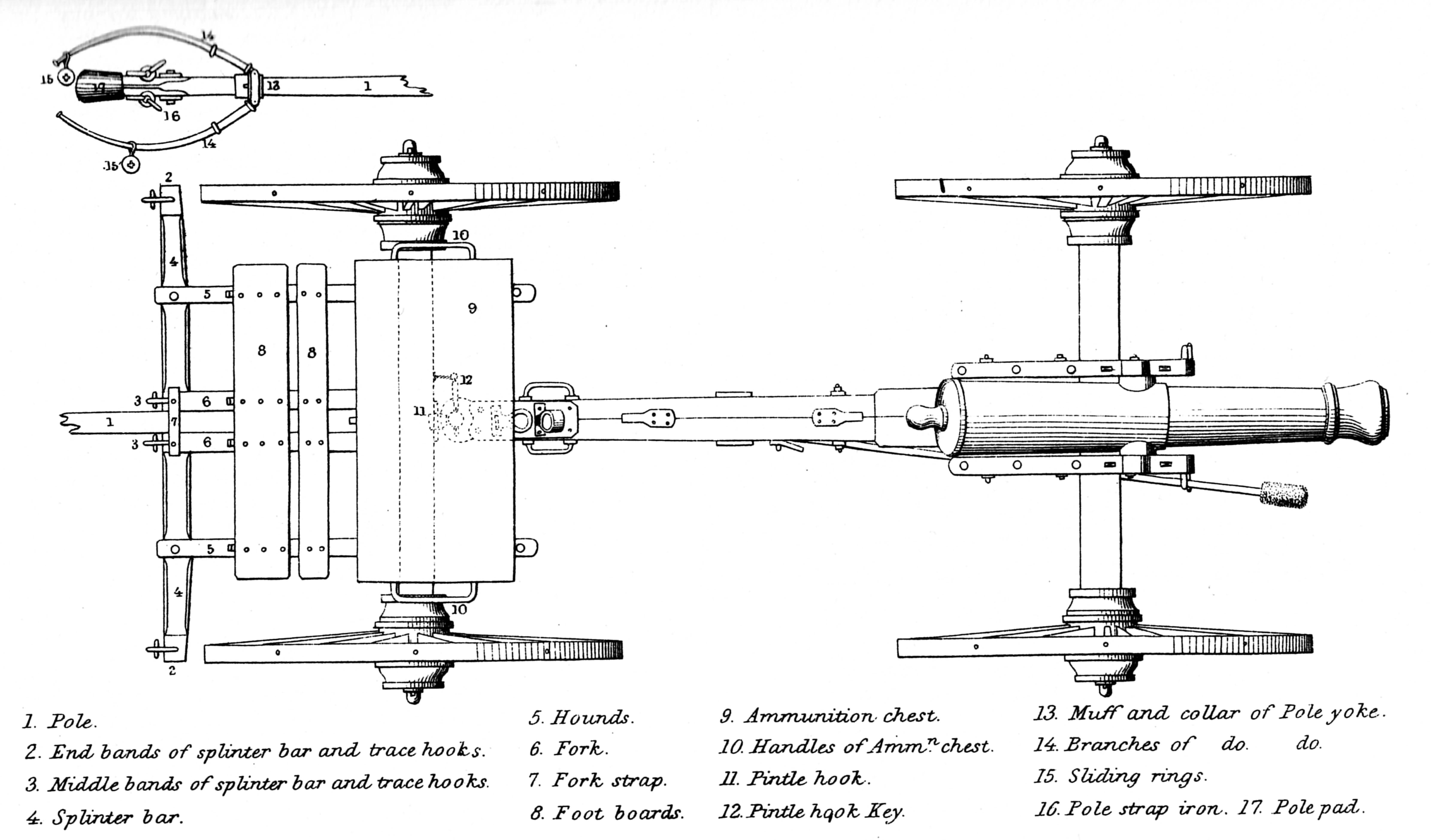
Limber (left) and field gun, c. 1864 (top view)

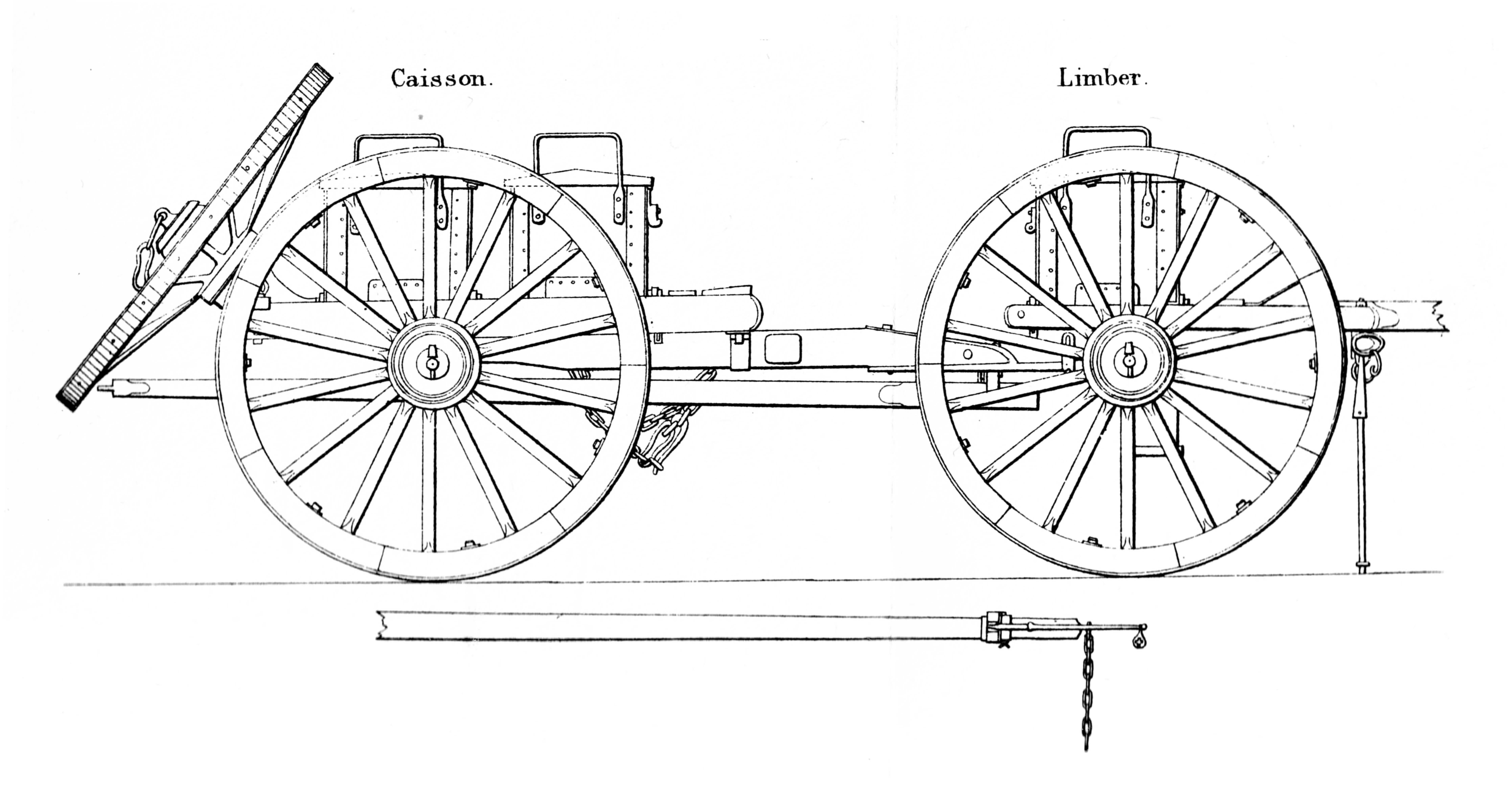
Caisson (left) and limber, c. 1863

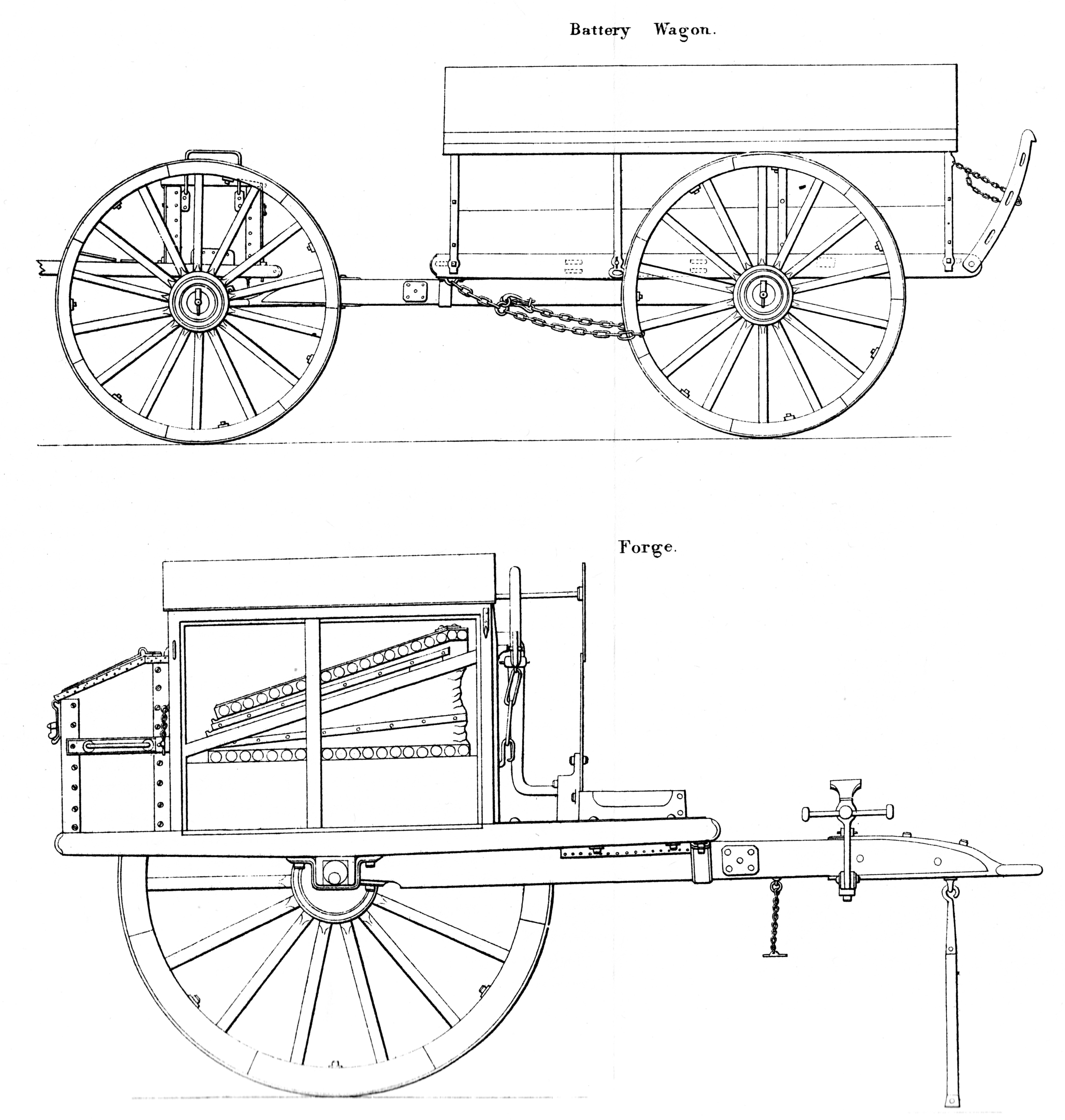
traveling forge and battery wagon, c. 1863. The battery wagon is shown attached to a limber

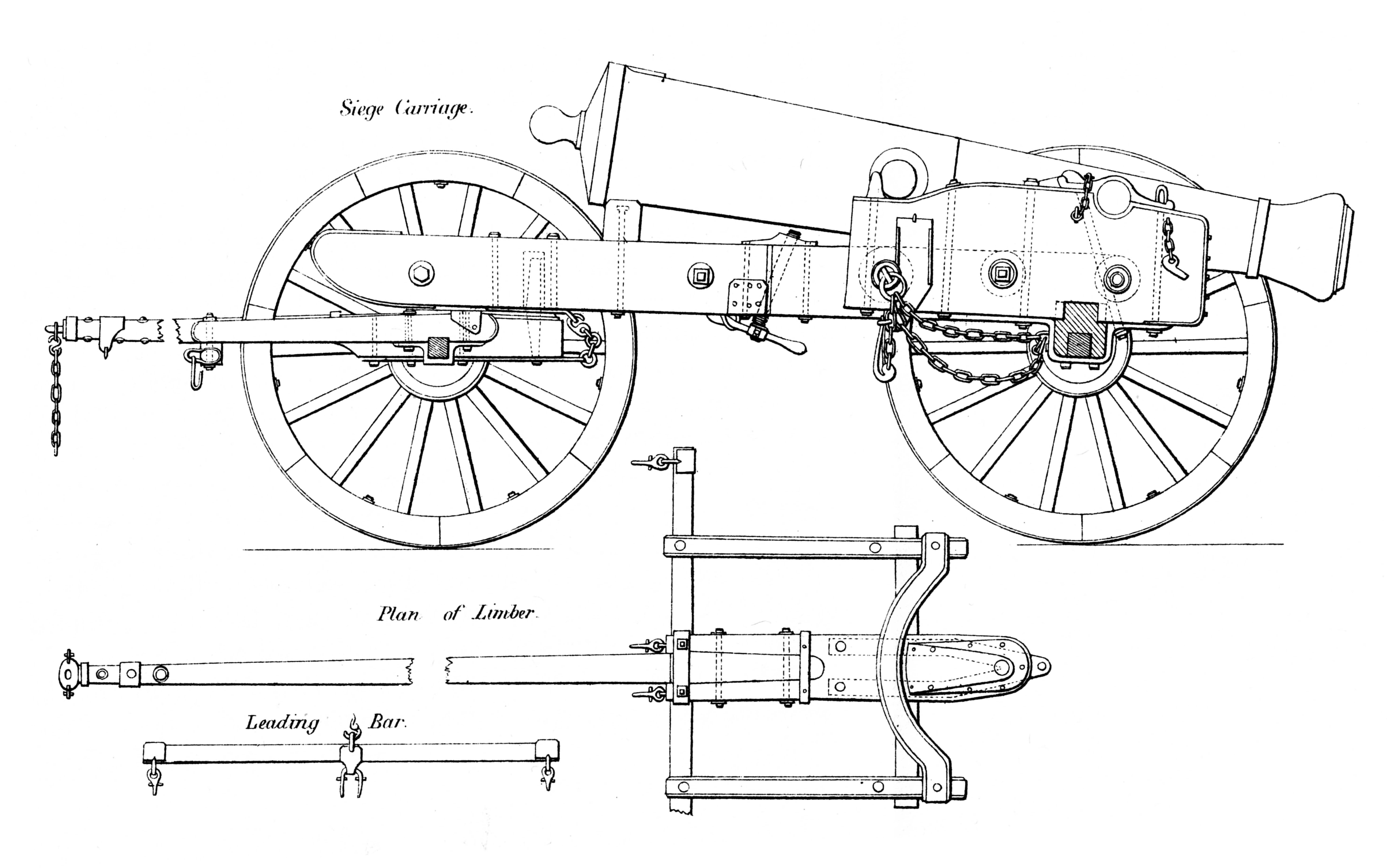
Limber (left) and siege gun, c. 1863

The British developed a new system of carriages, which was adopted by the French, then copied from the French by the Americans.

During the American Civil War, U.S. Army equipment was identical to Confederate Army equipment, essentially identical to French equipment, and similar to that of other nations. The field artillery limber assumed its archetypal form – two wheels, an ammunition chest, a pintle hook at the rear, and a central pole with horses harnessed on either side. The artillery piece had an iron ring (lunette) at the end of the trail. To move the piece, the lunette was dropped over the pintle hook (which resembles a modern trailer hitch). The connection was secured by inserting a pintle hook key into the pintle.

The quantity of ammunition in the chest, which could be detached from the limber, depended on the size of the piece. An ammunition chest for the M1857 light 12-pounder gun ("Napoleon") carried 28 rounds. The cover of the ammunition chest was made of sheet copper to prevent stray embers from setting the chest on fire.

Six horses were the preferred team for a field piece, with four being considered the minimum team. Horses were harnessed in pairs on either side of the limber pole. A driver rode on each left-hand ("near") horse and held reins for both the horse he rode and the horse to his right (the "off horse").

In addition to hauling the artillery piece, the limber also hauled the caisson, a two-wheeled cart that carried two extra ammunition chests, a spare wheel and extra limber pole slung beneath. There was one caisson for each artillery piece in a battery. The cannoneers could ride the ammunition chests on the limbers and the caisson when speed was required, but to do so for any length of time was too tiring for the horses, so cannoneers generally walked. The exception to this rule would be in horse-artillery batteries, where the cannoneers rode saddle horses.

When the artillery piece was in action, the piece's limber would have been six yards (5.5 m) behind the piece, depending on the terrain, with the caisson and its limber farther to the rear of the firing line, preferably behind some natural cover such as a ridge. While firing the piece, if possible, the crew kept the two ammunition chests on the caisson full, preferably supplying the gun from the third ammunition chest on the caisson's limber. When the ammunition from the ammunition chest on the piece's limber was exhausted, the piece's limber and the caisson's limber exchanged places. The empty ammunition chest was removed, and then the middle chest on the caisson was moved forward onto the limber. A fully loaded ammunition chest for a "Napoleon" 12-pounder weighed 650 pounds (300 kg), so the chest was dragged and pushed, rather than lifted, into place. With a full ammunition chest in place, the limber was ready to move forward and supply the piece.

Although the limber's primary purpose was to haul the artillery piece and the caisson, it also hauled the battery wagon and a traveling forge. The battery wagon carried spare parts, paint, etc., while the traveling forge was for use by a blacksmith in keeping the battery's hardware in repair. The ammunition chest on the limber hauling the battery wagon contained carpenters' and saddle-makers' tools, and the ammunition chest on the limber hauling the traveling forge contained blacksmiths' tools.

Siege artillery limbers, unlike field artillery limbers, did not have an ammunition chest. Siege artillery limbers resembled their predecessors: they were two-wheeled carts with a pintle, now somewhat behind the axle. When the piece was to be hauled, the trail was raised above the limber, then lowered, with the pintle fitting into a hole in the trail. Unlike the situation with its predecessors, horses were harnessed to the 19th-century limber in pairs, with six to ten horses needed to haul a siege gun or howitzer.

== 20th century ==
With the general passing of the horse as a mover of artillery, the need for limbers and caissons also largely passed. Trucks or artillery tractors could tow artillery pieces but did not completely take over until after the end of the Second World War. Many armies retained limbers seemingly from sheer inertia. As a field artillery piece, the British 25-pdr was designed to be towed only in conjunction with a trailer. The trailer provided the vital over-run braking system for the gun. Both the unsatisfactory, and consequently short lived, trailer artillery No. 24 and the far more usual No. 27, had the same type of wheel hubs as the gun. The No. 27 also carried 32 rounds of ammunition, had a useful stores tray on the front and brackets for a gun traversing platform and spare hub on the top .

Some simple limbers were kept for heavier pieces such as the eight-inch Howitzer M1 to achieve better weight distribution.

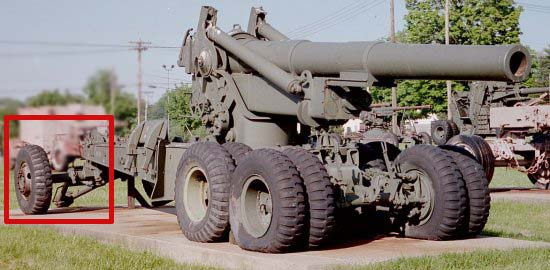
8-inch Howitzer M1 on a limber heavy carriage (limber highlighted by red box)

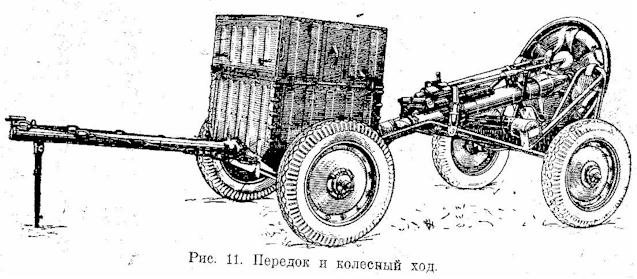
Soviet 120 mm mortar with limber, caption in Russian

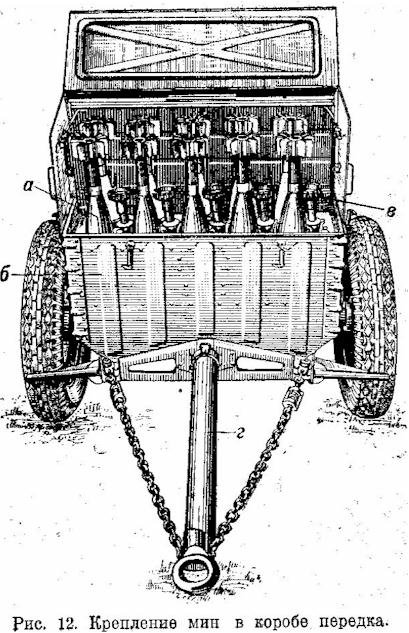
120 mm mortar rounds carried in limber

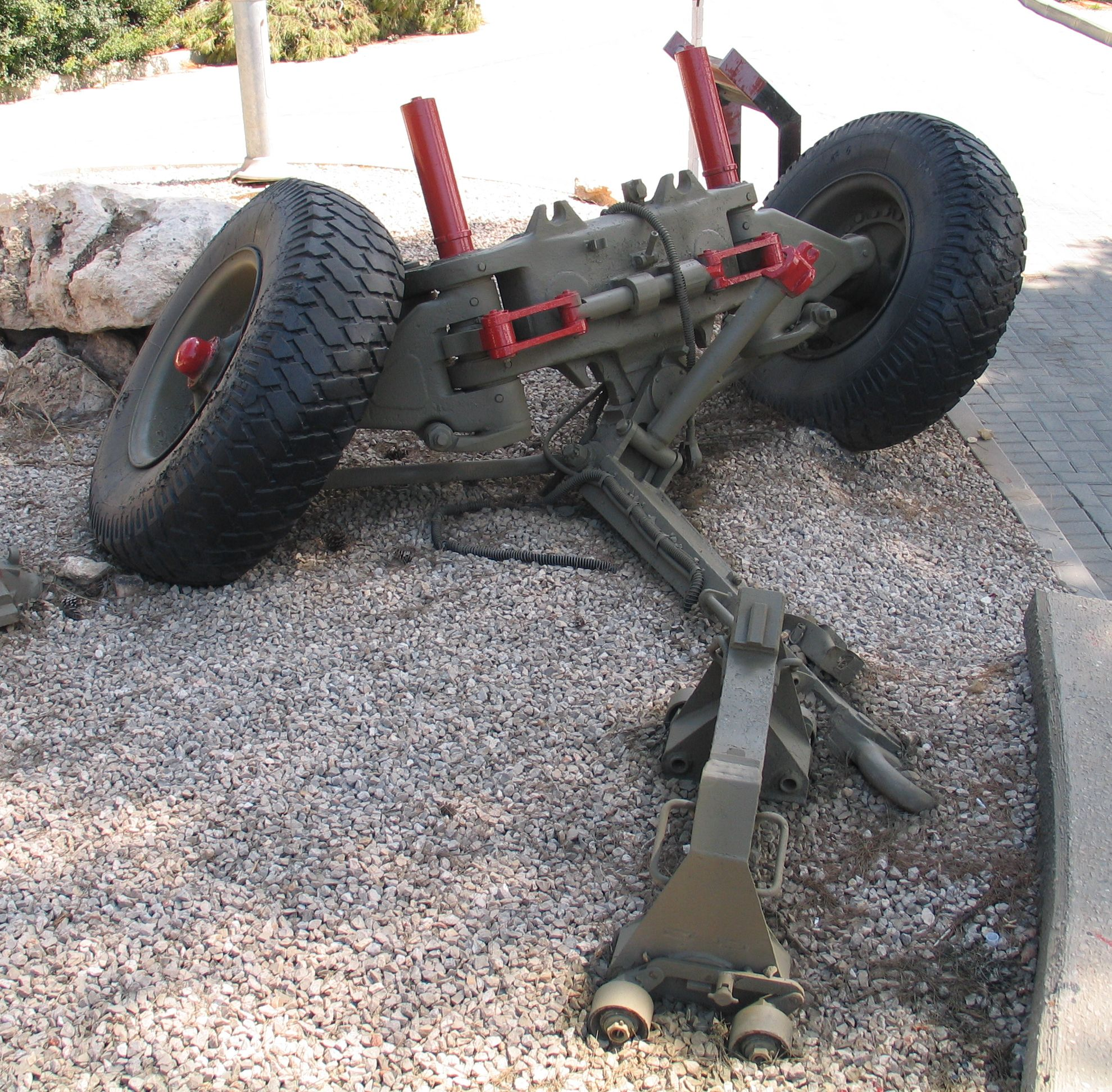
Modern limber without gun

== Caissons in American and British culture ==
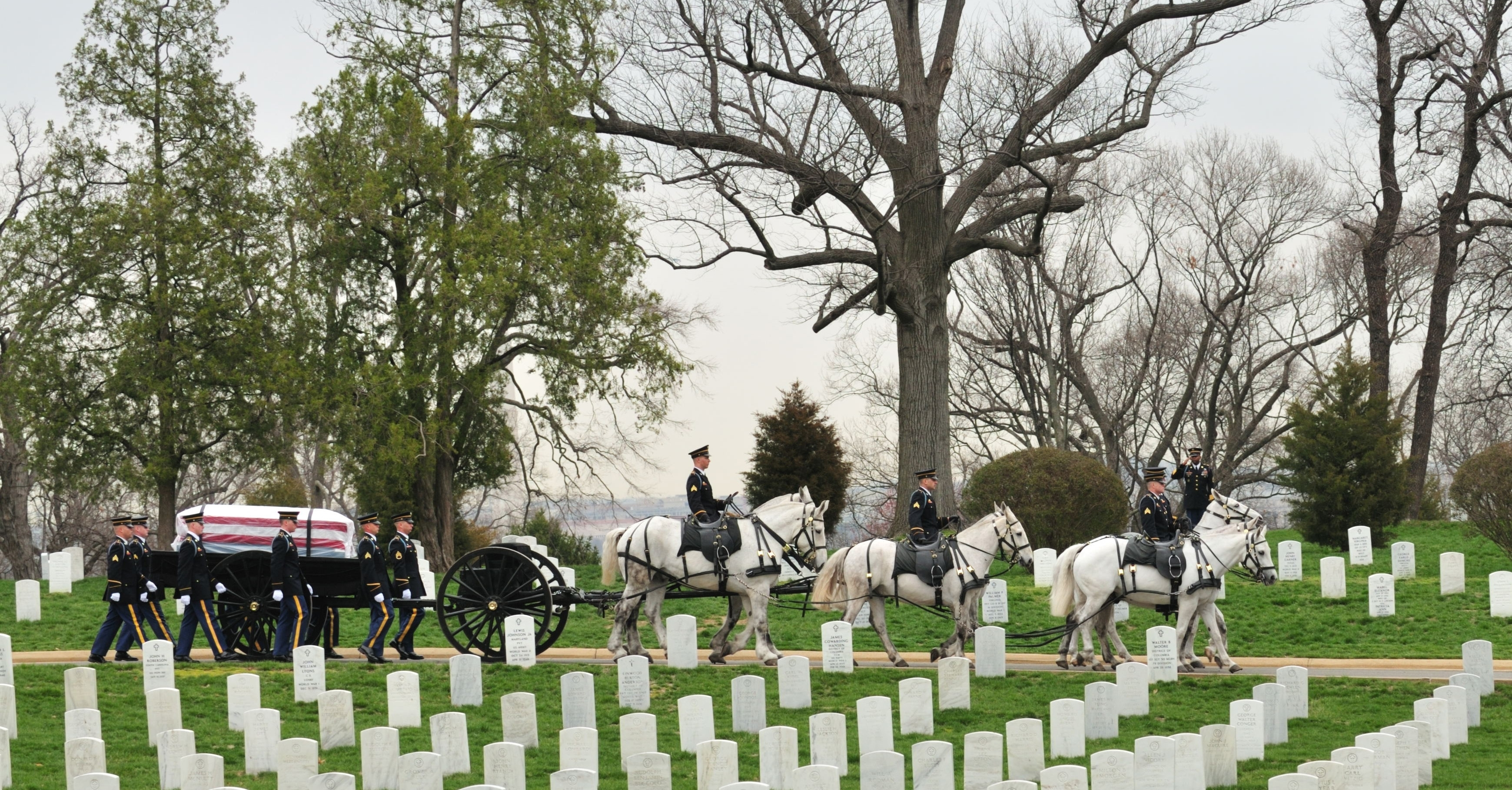
The Old Guard transports the flag-draped casket of the second Sergeant Major of the Army George W. Dunaway who was buried with full military honors at Arlington National Cemetery.

The song "The Caissons Go Rolling Along" refers to these; the version adopted as the U.S. Army's official song has, among other changes, replaced the word caissons with Army.

Caissons are used for burials at Arlington National Cemetery and for state funerals for United States government dignitaries including the President of the United States for the remains to be carried by members of The Old Guard's Caisson Platoon.

When the equipage is used in this way for a state funeral in Britain, the coffin is usually placed on a platform mounted on top of the gun and referred to as being carried on a gun carriage. For the funerals of British monarchs, there is a tradition that the horses be replaced by a detail from the Royal Navy.

== See also ==
- Bier
- Catafalque
- Dolly, a civilian term for similar two-wheeled intermediate trailers
- Field gun competition
- "U.S. Field Artillery" march, composed 1917 by John Philip Sousa
