= George Khoury (molecular biologist) =

American scientist

George Khoury (1943 – April 25, 1987) was an American scientist who was chief of the molecular virology laboratory at the National Cancer Institute from 1980 to his death. He conducted early research with enhancers and was elected to membership in the National Academy of Sciences shortly before his death from lymphoma.

== Biography ==
Born in Pittsburgh to George and Dorothy Khoury, he attended William Allen High School. Khoury graduated from Princeton University and Harvard Medical School. At Harvard, he received early research training from John Franklin Enders, and he began to study SV40 with Jan van der Noorda. After a year as a medical intern at Massachusetts General Hospital, Khoury joined NIH as a research associate. He conducted early investigations into transcription patterns in the SV40 genome.

In 1980, Khoury was named chief of the Laboratory of Molecular Biology at the National Cancer Institute. At NCI, Khoury's lab uncovered the first genetic enhancer while working with SV40. Nadia Rosenthal, one of the researchers in Khoury's lab, later found the first human enhancer. Khoury played a large part in the establishment of the microbiology department at Princeton University, and he helped to establish a research program for undergraduates that was jointly administered by the NIH and the Howard Hughes Medical Institute.

Khoury received an Arthur S. Flemming Award in 1981 in recognition of outstanding service to the U.S. government. He was elected to the National Academy of Sciences in 1987.

Khoury was treated for lymphoma in the last few years of his life; he went into remission several times. He died of the illness shortly after he was elected to the NAS. He was survived by a wife, Marilyn, and two children. The George Khoury Lecture was established in his memory by NIH. A scholarship in his name, The George Khoury '65 Prize for Academic Excellence, is awarded each year to a senior in the Molecular Biology Department at Princeton University.
