= Traveling forge =

Mobile blacksmith shop

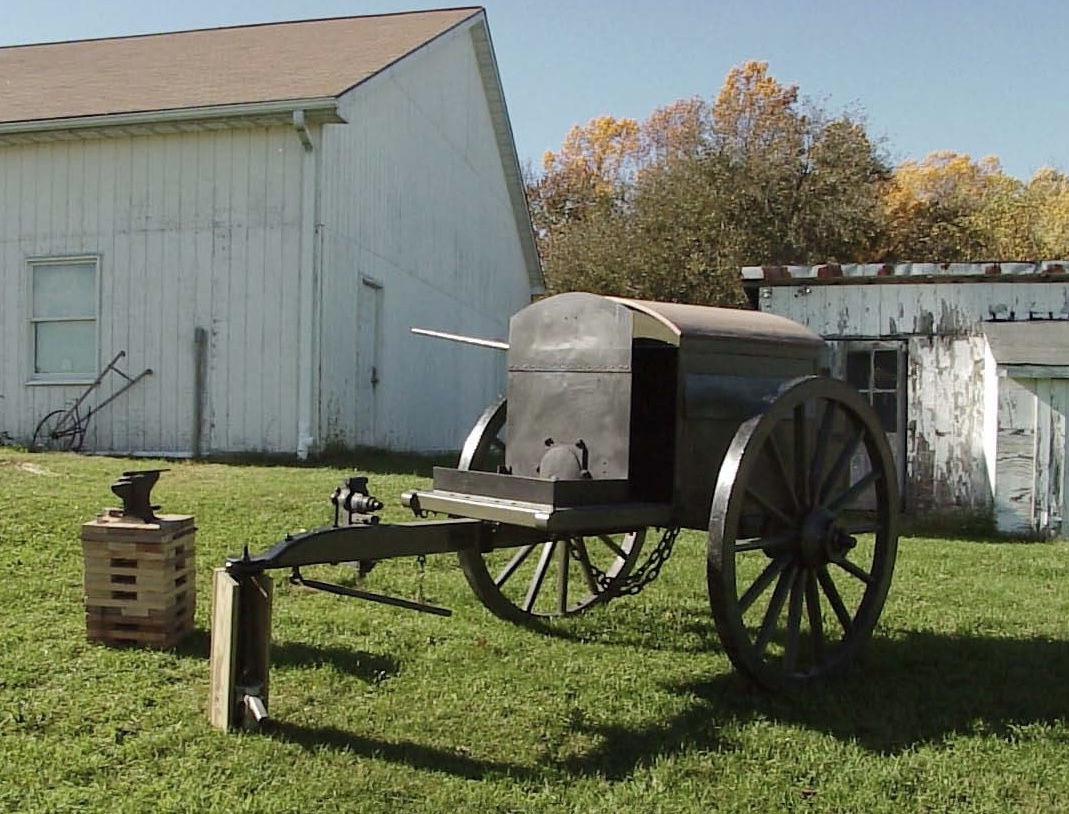
A reproduction traveling forge. Circa 1850s through 1860s U.S. blacksmith's traveling forge.

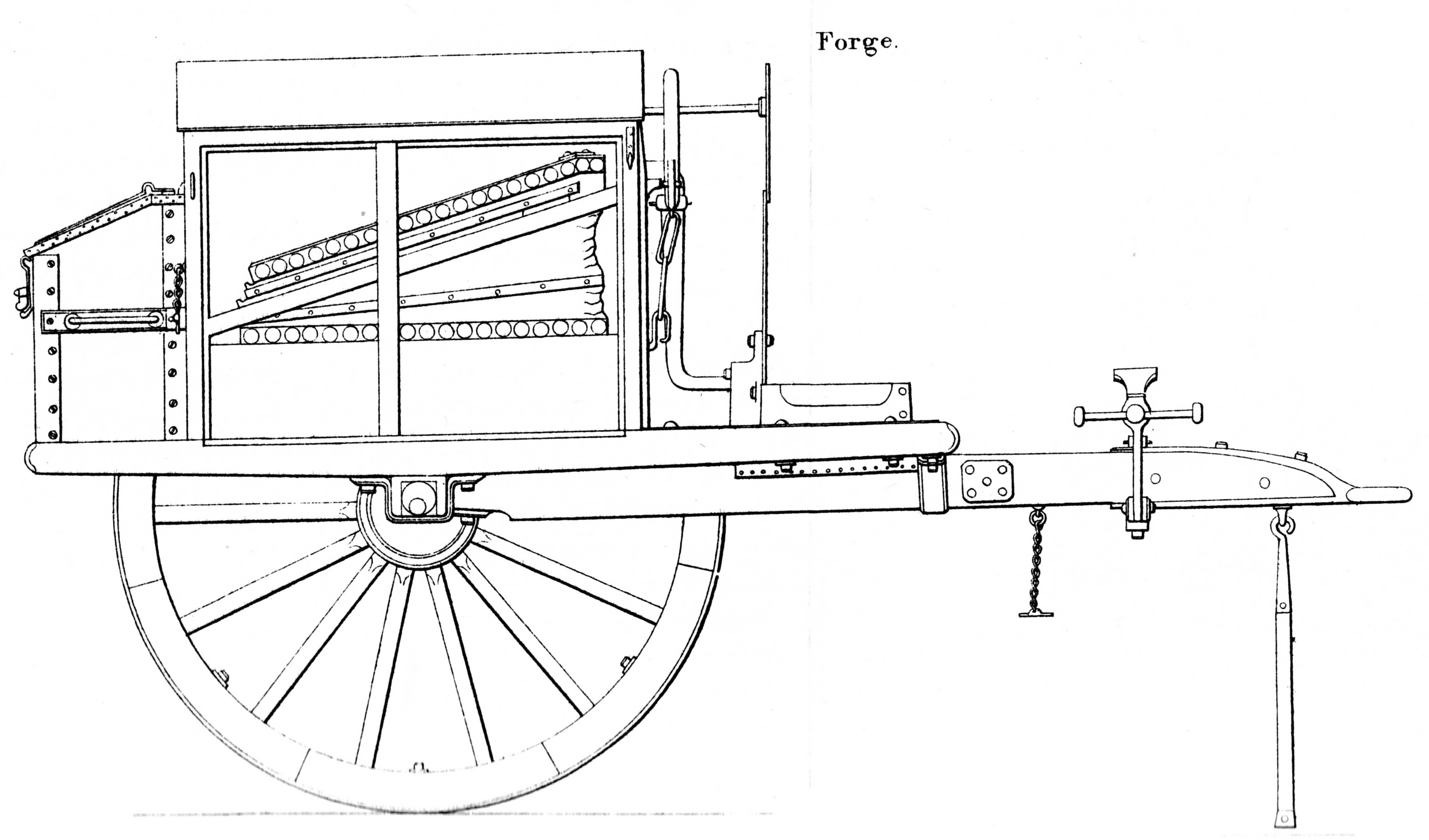
Sketch of U.S. Civil War Traveling Forge from the Ordnance Manual of 1863.

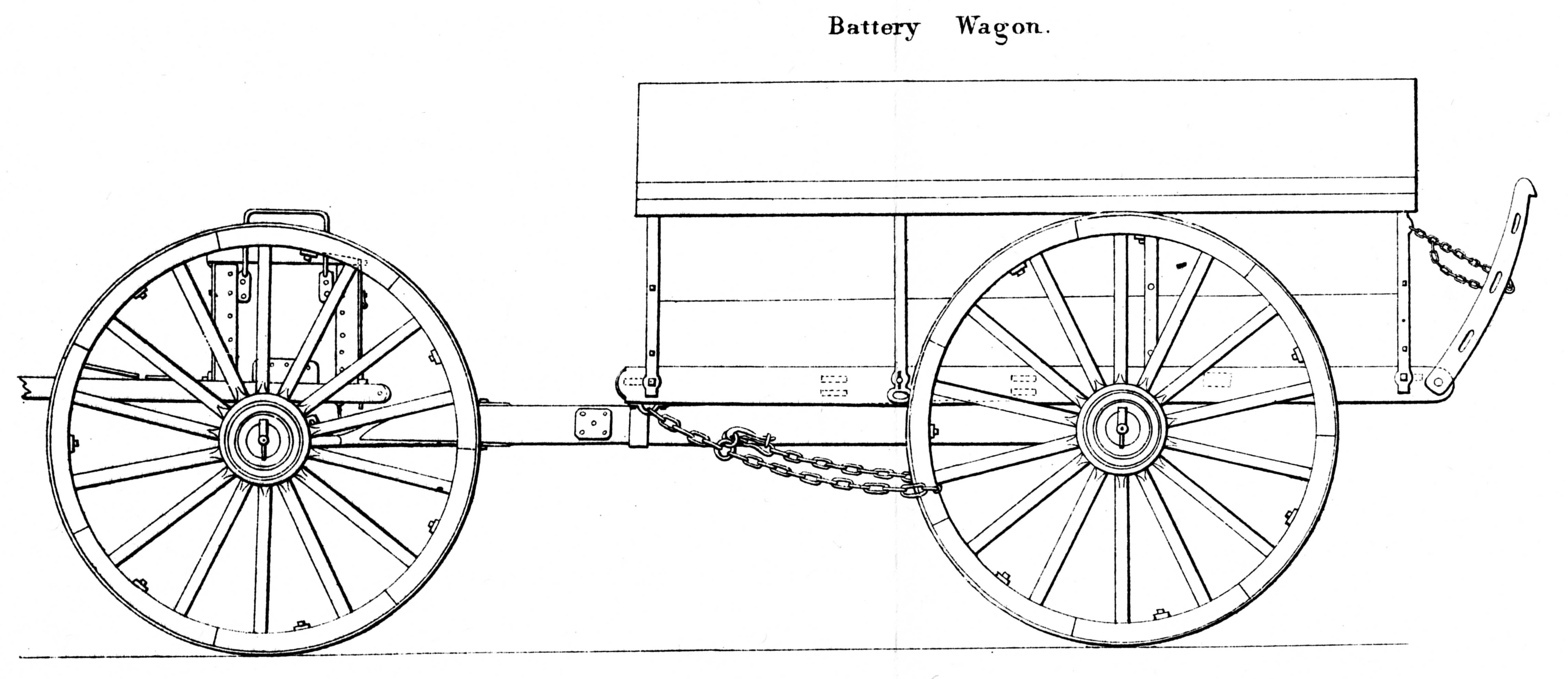
Sketch of U.S. Civil War Battery Wagon with Limber from the Ordnance Manual of 1861.

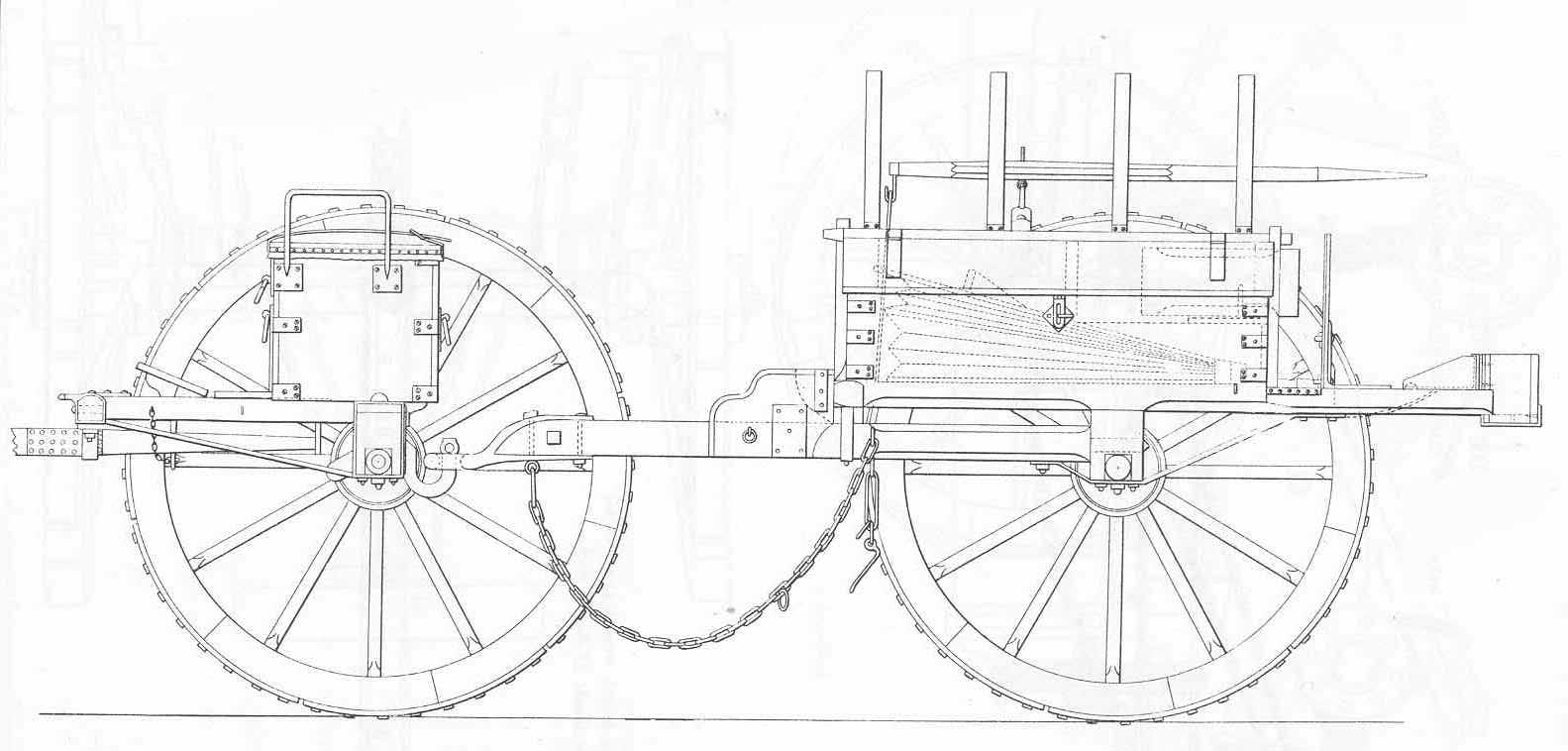
British 1840s Period Forge Wagon side view by Royal Engineers, British Service. Image is from Volume 1 of 6 volumes, An Aide-Memoire to the Military Sciences, 1845, Col. G.G. Lewis, senior editor.

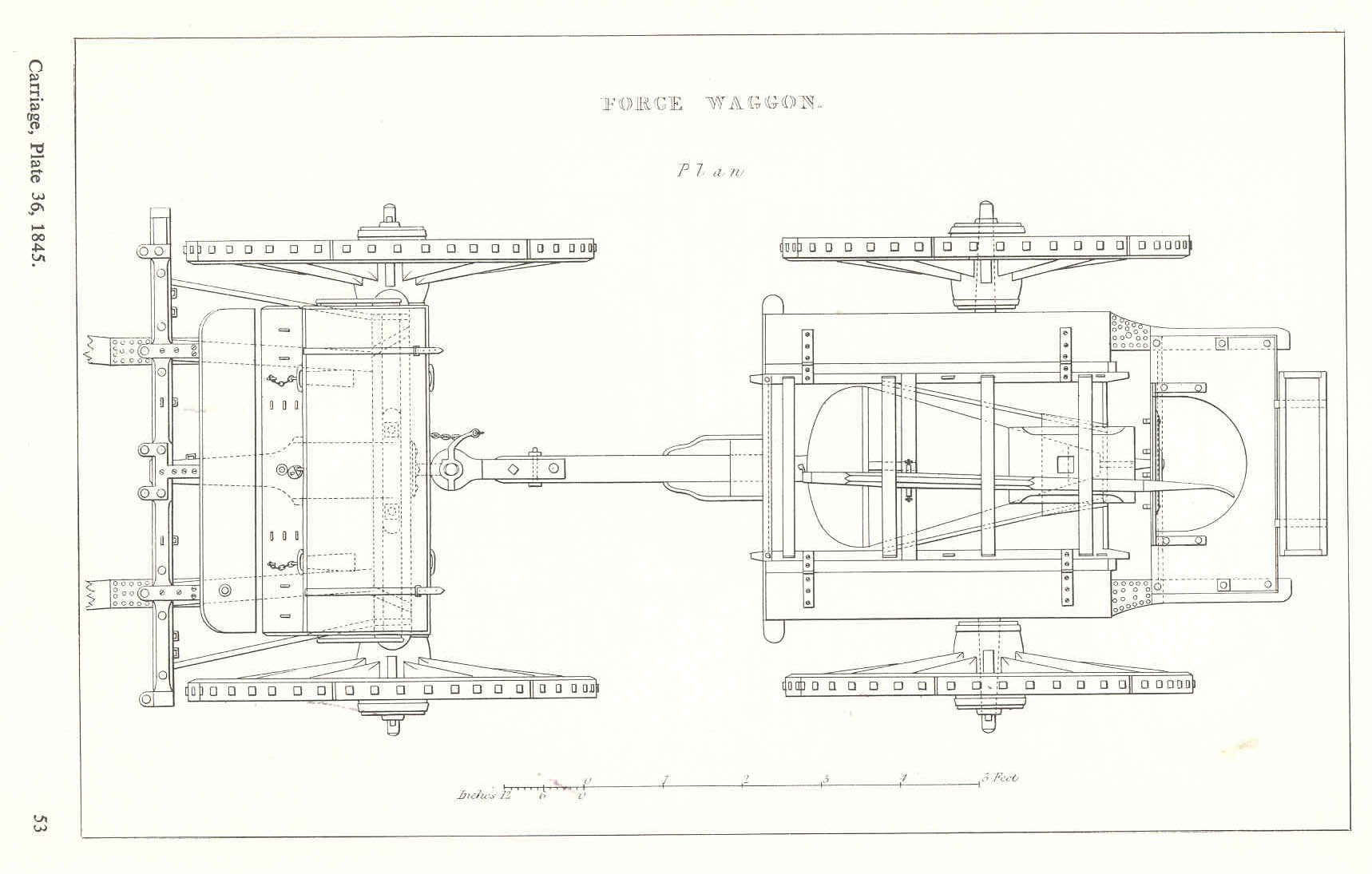
British 1840s Period Forge Wagon top view by Royal Engineers, British Service.

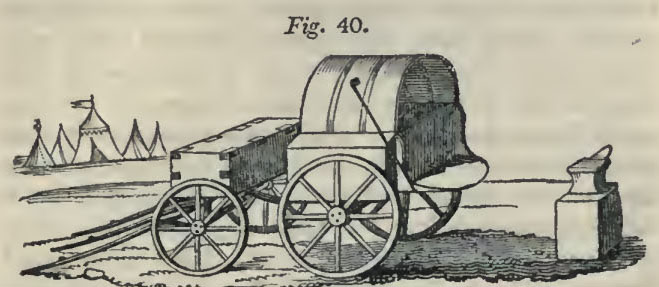
1831 Sketch of U.S. Army Traveling Forge by John Holland, A Treatise on the Progressive Improvement and Present State of the Manufactures in Metal, Volume 1.

A traveling forge, when combined with a limber, comprised wagons specifically designed and constructed as blacksmith shops on wheels to carry the essential equipment necessary for blacksmiths, artisans (called artificers in many armies) and farriers to both shoe horses and repair wagons and artillery equipment for both U.S. and Confederate armies during the American Civil War, as well as by western European armies. The traveling forge was frequently also referred to in The Official Records simply as a forge, and sometimes referred to by Civil War buffs as a battery forge.

== Overview ==
An American Civil War-era traveling forge contained 1,200 pounds (540 kg) of tools, coal and supplies. These tools and supplies included a bellows attached to a fireplace, a 4-inch-wide (100 mm) vise, 100-pound (45 kg) anvil, a box containing 250 pounds (110 kg) of coal, 200 pounds (91 kg) of horse shoes, 4-foot-long (1.2 m) bundled bars of iron, and on the limber was a box containing the smith's hand tools. A battery wagon accompanied each traveling forge carrying additional blacksmith, wheelwright, and carriage repair supplies.

American Civil War-era traveling forge wagons evolved from crude blacksmith carts used during the American Revolutionary War as well as from equipment used in Europe during the 1840s. British traveling forges were documented in An Aide-Memoire to the Military Sciences volume 1 by Royal Engineers, British Service, 1845, Col. G.G. Lewis, senior editor.

British traveling forges likely had canvas covers as indicated by the number and spacing of wood arches above the bellows, and what appears to be cord anchor points on the sides of the bellows house. A canvas cover would have been logical as protection of the bellows from the weather, and in accordance with the standard practice of covering wagons at that time. This canvas cover evolved into the wooden cover of the U.S. version of the traveling forge.

The U.S. mid-19th century traveling forge was standardized for U.S. manufacturers in the drawings created by Captain Albert Mordecai circa 1850 under commission by the federal government. Copies of Captain Mordecai's drawings are currently published by Antique Ordnance Publishers. The book Field Artillery Traveling Forge book No. 61 published by Antique Ordnance Publishers contains most of the measured drawings and other information necessary to reproduce the traveling forge. Additional crucial information covering measurements, construction and materials used with the traveling forge may be found in the Ordnance Manual of 1863.

The Ordnance Manual of 1863 says that in use, the traveling forge was hooked to the back of a limber that was identical in construction to the limbers used to pull field cannon, except for the internal arrangement of the limber chest. The Ordnance Manual of 1863 details information about the wheels, paint, wood and iron parts used on the traveling forge, as well as the tools stored in the traveling forge's limber chest and in the battery wagon for use by the blacksmiths and artisans.

During the Civil War, a traveling forge was provided for each cannon battery, and other traveling forges accompanied each army to provide service to equipment and horses. Portable sheet metal Mountain Forges were provided to units with mountain howitzers which were primarily deployed in mountainous areas inaccessible to the No. 1 cannon carriage and wagons.

The Official Records only document official government built traveling forges constructed according to specifications in the Ordnance Manuals and the Mordecai drawings. No evidence exists that either army ever used traveling forges that were not built by government contractors.

== Bibliography ==
- Civil War Blacksmithing (December 2010), David Einhorn, CreateSpace Publishing, a subsidiary of Amazon.com, ISBN 1-4563-6481-2, ISBN 978-1-4563-6481-6
- Field Artillery Traveling Forge book No. 61 by Antique Ordnance Publishers Inc.
- The Ordnance Manual For The Use Of The Officers Of The Confederate States Army, 1863 reprinted by Morningside Press 1995,
  ISBN 0-89029-033-4
- The ordnance manual for the use of officers of the United States army. reprinted by Scholarly Publishing Office, University of Michigan Library, December 22, 2005, ISBN 1-4255-5971-9
- A Treatise on the Progressive Improvement and Present State of the Manufactures in Metal, Volume 1, 1831 by John Holland (Author) London Printed for Longman, Rees, Orme, Brown, and Green[etc.]
