= Altair (spacecraft) =

Planned lander spacecraft component of NASA's cancelled Project Constellation

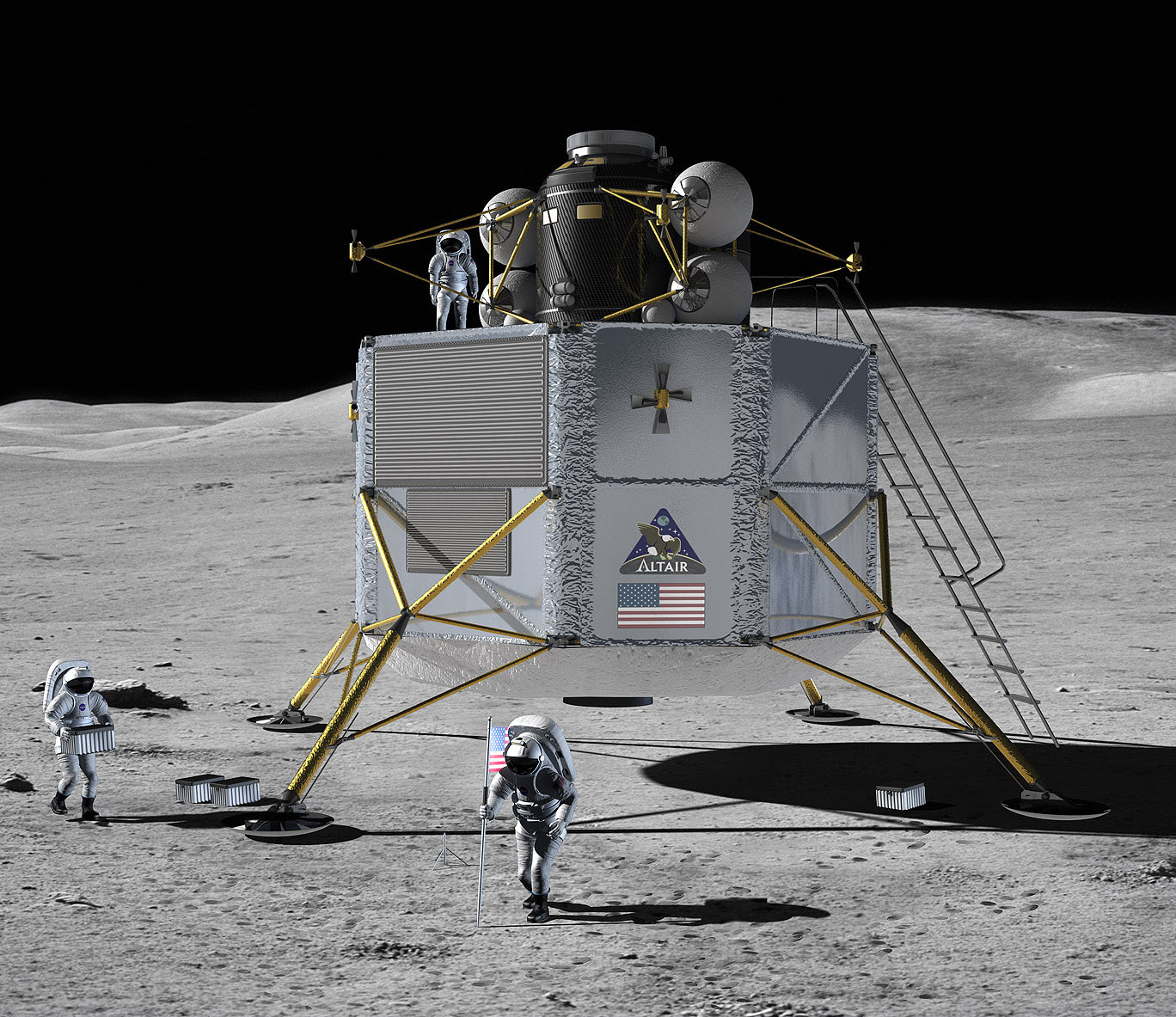
- Artist's impression of the crewed version of Altair on the surface of the Moon
- Names: Lunar Surface Access Module (LSAM)
- Operator: NASA

Spacecraft properties
- Spacecraft type: Lander
- Launch mass: 45,864 kg (101,113 lb)
- Payload mass: 14,500 kg (32,000 lb)

Start of mission
- Rocket: Ares V
- Launch site: Kennedy LC-39A

Orbital parameters
- Reference system: Selenocentric
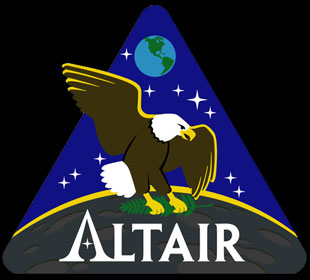
- Constellation program

The Altair spacecraft, previously known as the Lunar Surface Access Module or LSAM, was the planned lander spacecraft component of NASA's cancelled Constellation program. Astronauts would have used the spacecraft for landings on the Moon, which was intended to begin around 2019. The Altair spacecraft was planned to be used both for lunar sortie and lunar outpost missions.

On February 1, 2010, U.S. President Barack Obama announced a proposal to cancel the Constellation program (except the Orion spacecraft), to be replaced with a re-scoped program, effective with the U.S. 2011 fiscal year budget.

== Name ==
On December 13, 2007, NASA's Lunar Surface Access Module was retitled "Altair", after the 12th brightest star in the northern hemisphere's night sky, Altair in the constellation Aquila. In Latin, aquila means "eagle", providing a connection to the first crewed lunar landing, Apollo 11's Eagle; the name Altair itself is a latinization of the Arabic الطائر al-ṭā'ir, meaning "the eagle," "the bird," or "the flyer."

Prior to the announcement of the "Altair" name, reports had suggested other names had been considered by NASA, but Altair won in a vote by the design team over Pegasus.

== Description ==
NASA developed only conceptual designs for Altair. No Altair spacecraft were built—plans called for a first landing on the Moon in 2018.

Like the Apollo Lunar Module (LM), Altair was envisioned as having two stages. The descent module comprising propellant tanks, a main engine, landing gear and supporting structure and an Ascent Module with a pressurized crew cabin, life support systems, docking systems, avionics, propellant tanks and engine for lunar ascent.

Like the Apollo LM, the Altair's crew cabin was based on that of a cylinder. Initially a horizontal cylinder, like that of the LM (despite the "boxy" appearance on the outside), contemporary blueprints and computer simulations showed the use of a vertical cylinder. Unlike its two-man Apollo ancestor, Altair was designed to carry the entire four-person crew to the surface, while the temporarily unoccupied Orion crew module would have remained in lunar orbit.

Altair was intended to be capable of operating away from Earth (in space and on the lunar surface) for up to 210 Earth days. Altair would also be capable of flying uncrewed missions, as had been proposed with LM Truck concept during the Apollo Applications Program. Mission planners would have been able to choose among three distinct mission modes for Altair:

1. Crewed sortie mode
2. Crewed outpost mode (with no airlock)
3. Uncrewed cargo mode, capable of transporting up to 15 metric tons to the lunar surface

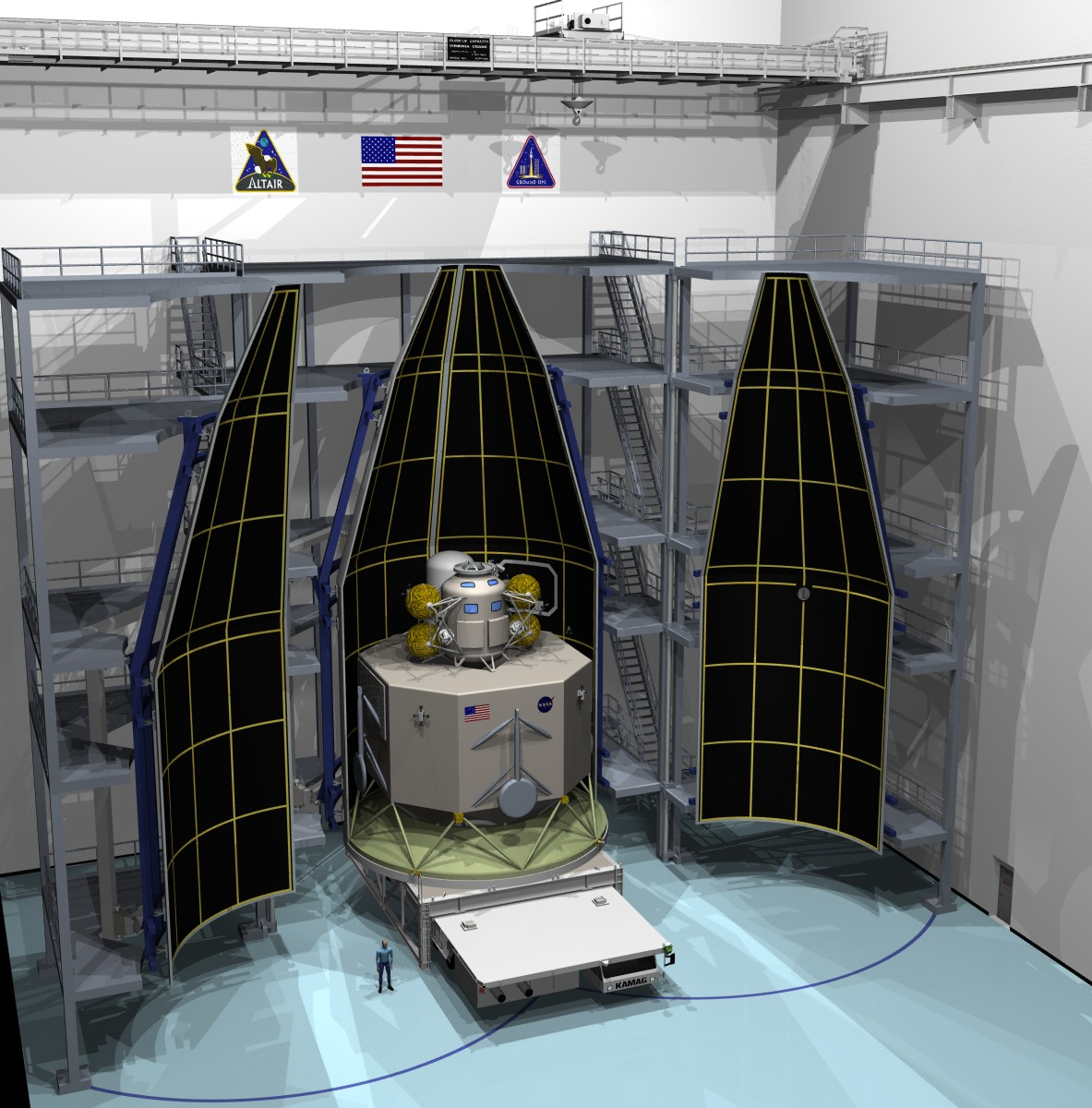
Artist's rendering of Altair being encased in a shroud

Altair, like the LM, was planned to have two hatches; one on top for docking and internal transfer between Altair and Orion, and a main hatch for accessing the lunar surface. Unlike the Apollo LM, Altair would have an airlock similar to those on the Space Shuttle and the International Space Station between the cabin and main hatch. The airlock allowed the astronauts to don and doff their spacesuits without tracking potentially hazardous Moon dust into the main cabin and allowed the vehicle to retain its internal pressure. Unlike the Apollo LM, in which the entire cabin was depressurized during extra-vehicular activity, the airlock would allow a crew member with a malfunctioning spacesuit to quickly return to the Altair spacecraft without having to terminate the entire EVA, and allowed the landing party to complete most of their tasks during their 7-day lunar stay. Also, the airlock would remain as part of the Altair's descent stage, allowing NASA to utilize the airlock as a component of the Lunar Outpost.

Because the Ares V payload shroud was planned to have a diameter of 33 feet (10 m) and height of 49 feet (15 m) (including landing gear), the landers were designed to retract so as to fit within the Ares V's payload shroud.

The spacecraft would also have included an improved miniature camping-style toilet, similar to the unit now used on the ISS and the Russian Soyuz spacecraft, a food warmer to eliminate the "cold soup" menu used during Apollo missions, a laser-guided distance measurement system (with radar backup), using data acquired by advanced uncrewed lunar orbiting spacecraft, and new "glass cockpit" and Boeing 787-based computer system identical to that on the Orion spacecraft.

=== Engines ===
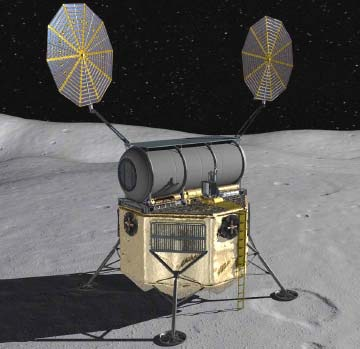
Cargo variant of Altair

Altair intended to utilize current cryogenic technologies for the descent stages and hypergolic technologies for the ascent stage. The Apollo LM, as advanced in both computer and engineering technology in its day, used hypergolic fuels in both of its stages, chemicals that combust on contact with each other, requiring no ignition mechanism and allowing an indefinite storage period. Both the cryogenic and hypergolic systems, like that of the Apollo LM, would be force-fed using high-pressure helium, eliminating the need for the turbopumps utilized in most rocket engines.

Mission requirements obliged the vehicle to be able to descend from an equatorial or high-inclination lunar orbit to a polar landing site, along with bringing it and the Orion spacecraft into lunar orbit, as the Orion spacecraft's onboard Aerojet AJ-10 rocket engine and the amount of fuel it carried would have been insufficient to brake the Orion/Altair stack into lunar orbit (also necessary if flown without Orion for cargo-only missions). The new lander would have been powered by a modified RL10 engine (currently in use on the upper stage of the Delta IV rocket and Centaur upper stage of the Atlas V rocket), burning liquid hydrogen (LH_{2}) and liquid oxygen (LOX) for the descent phase. A single AJ-10 rocket engine, like that on the Orion, was intended to power the ascent stage.

Originally, NASA wanted to power the ascent stage using LOX and liquid methane (LCH_{4}) engines, RS-18, as future missions to Mars would require the astronauts to live on the planet. The Sabatier Reactor could be used to convert the carbon dioxide (CO_{2}) found on Mars into methane, using either found or transported hydrogen, a catalyst, and a source of heat. Cost overruns and immature LOX/LCH_{4} rocket technology forced NASA to stick with cryogenic and hypergolic systems, although later variants of Altair were meant to serve as testbeds for methane rockets and Sabatier reactors after a permanent lunar base was established.

== On-orbit assembly ==
Because of the spacecraft's size and weight, Altair, and its associated Earth Departure Stage, would have been launched into a low-Earth orbit (LEO) using the super heavy-lift Ares V launch vehicle, followed by a separate launch of an Orion spacecraft lifted by an Ares I. After rendezvous and docking with Altair in LEO, the crew would have then configured the Orion/Altair for the journey to the Moon.

== Offices and development ==
The development of Altair was managed by the Constellation Lunar Lander Project Office at Johnson Space Center (JSC). JSC worked directly with Apollo astronauts, various industry suppliers and universities to develop the architecture for Altair. In conjunction with early development a mockup or testbed was to have been developed at JSC to study/develop specialized subsystems and other design considerations. Northrop Grumman, which built the Apollo Lunar Module, was contracted to help the project office develop the system concept.

== See also ==
- List of crewed lunar lander designs
