= Pintle =

Pin or bolt used as part of a pivot or hinge

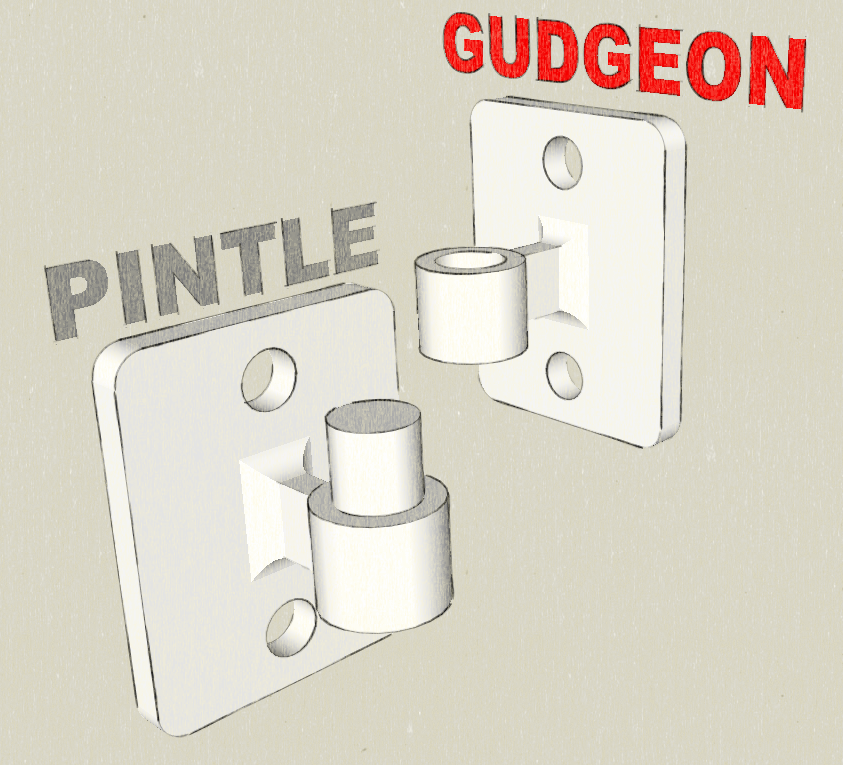
Image depicting a gudgeon with a pintle

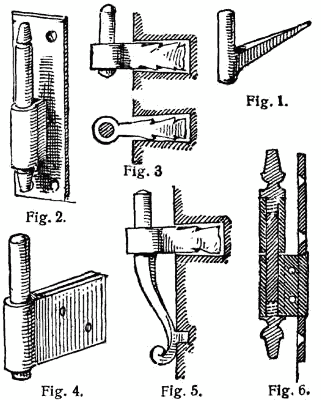
Several examples of pintles as part of door hinges

A pintle is a pin or bolt, usually inserted into a gudgeon, which is used as part of a pivot or hinge. Other applications include pintle and lunette ring for towing, and pintle pins securing casters in furniture.

== Use ==
Pintle/gudgeon sets have many applications, for example in sailing, to hold the rudder onto the boat; in transportation, in which a pincer-type device clamps through a lunette ring on the tongue of a trailer; and in controllable solid rocket motors, in which a plug moves into and out of the motor throat to control thrust.

In electrical cubicle manufacture, a pintle hinge is a hinge with fixed and moving parts. The hinge has a pin—the pintle—which can be both external and internal. The most common type consists of three parts, one part on the body of the cubicle, one part on the door, and the third being the pintle.

In transportation, a pintle hitch is a type of tow hitch that uses a tow ring configuration to secure to a hook or a ball combination for the purpose of towing an unpowered vehicle.

As a weapon mount, a pintle mount is used with machine guns as the mounting hardware that mates the machine gun to a vehicle or tripod. Essentially, the pintle is a bracket with a cylindrical bottom and a cradle for the gun on top; the cylindrical bottom fits into a hole in the tripod while the cradle holds the gun.

In furniture, a pintle is usually fitted to a caster; the pintle is then inserted into a base, fixing the caster to that base.

In rocketry, a pintle injector uses a single-feed fuel injector rather than the hundreds of smaller holes used in a typical rocket engine. This simplifies the engine, reducing cost and improving reliability, while surrendering some performance. Grumman used the pintle-based Rocketdyne RS-18 for the Ascent stage of the Apollo Lunar Module. TRW used this same injector for the Descent Propulsion System on Apollo's Lunar Module. Notable modern uses are in the Merlin engines developed by SpaceX

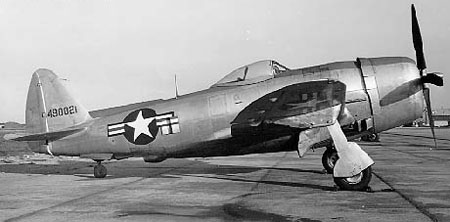
The forward-raked main gear struts on the Republic P-47 partly used "pintle angling" to allow them to clear the forward wingspar during retraction.

Pintle is also a common term used in the design of aircraft landing gears. It describes the attachment point between the landing gear structure and the aircraft structure. The pintle is the bolt around which the landing gear rotates when it is extended/retracted into/out of the aircraft. The pintle is a highly stressed component during landing manoeuvres and is often made from exotic metal alloys. For World War II aircraft with sideways-retracting main gear units, carefully set-up "pintle angles" for such axes of rotation during retraction and extension allowed the maingear struts to be raked forward while fully extended for touchdown and better ground handling, while permitting retraction into rearwards-angled landing gear wells in their wings to usually clear the forward wing spar for stowing while in flight.

== Gallery ==
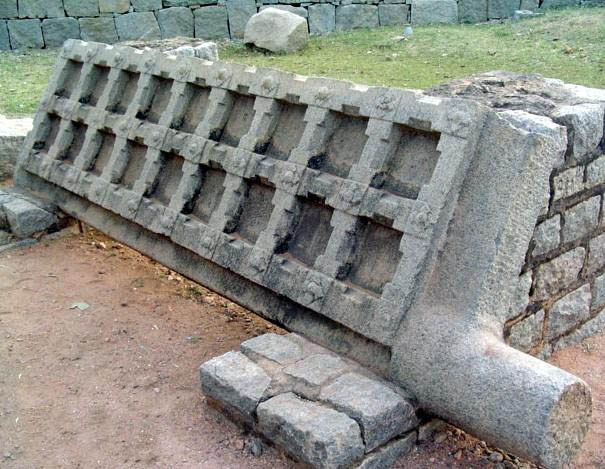
Massive pintles on a stone door; early doors often pivoted on pintles

Pintle and gudgeon rudder system. Part 2 is the pintle, and part 3 is the gudgeon.

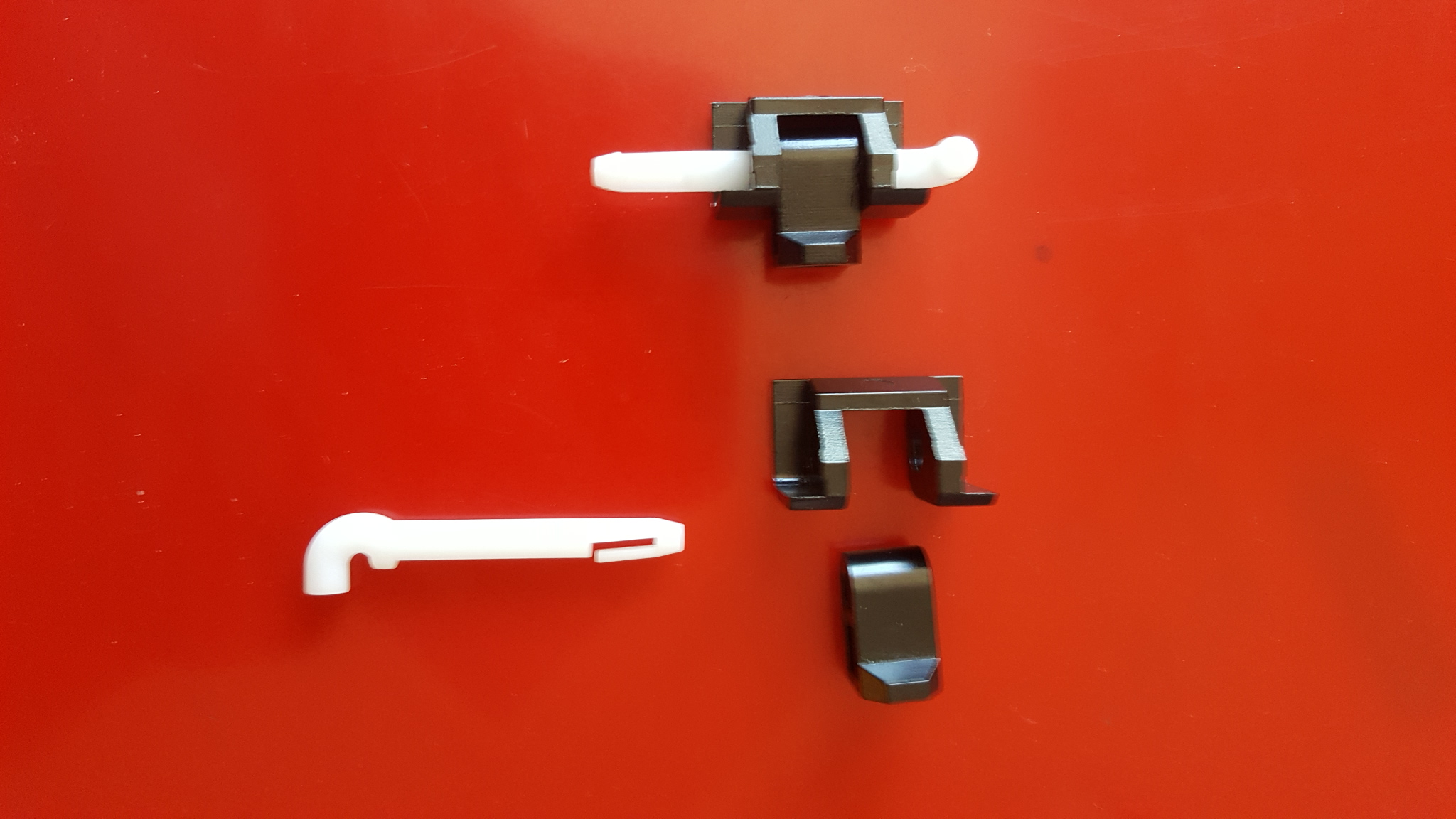
Pintle hinge parts

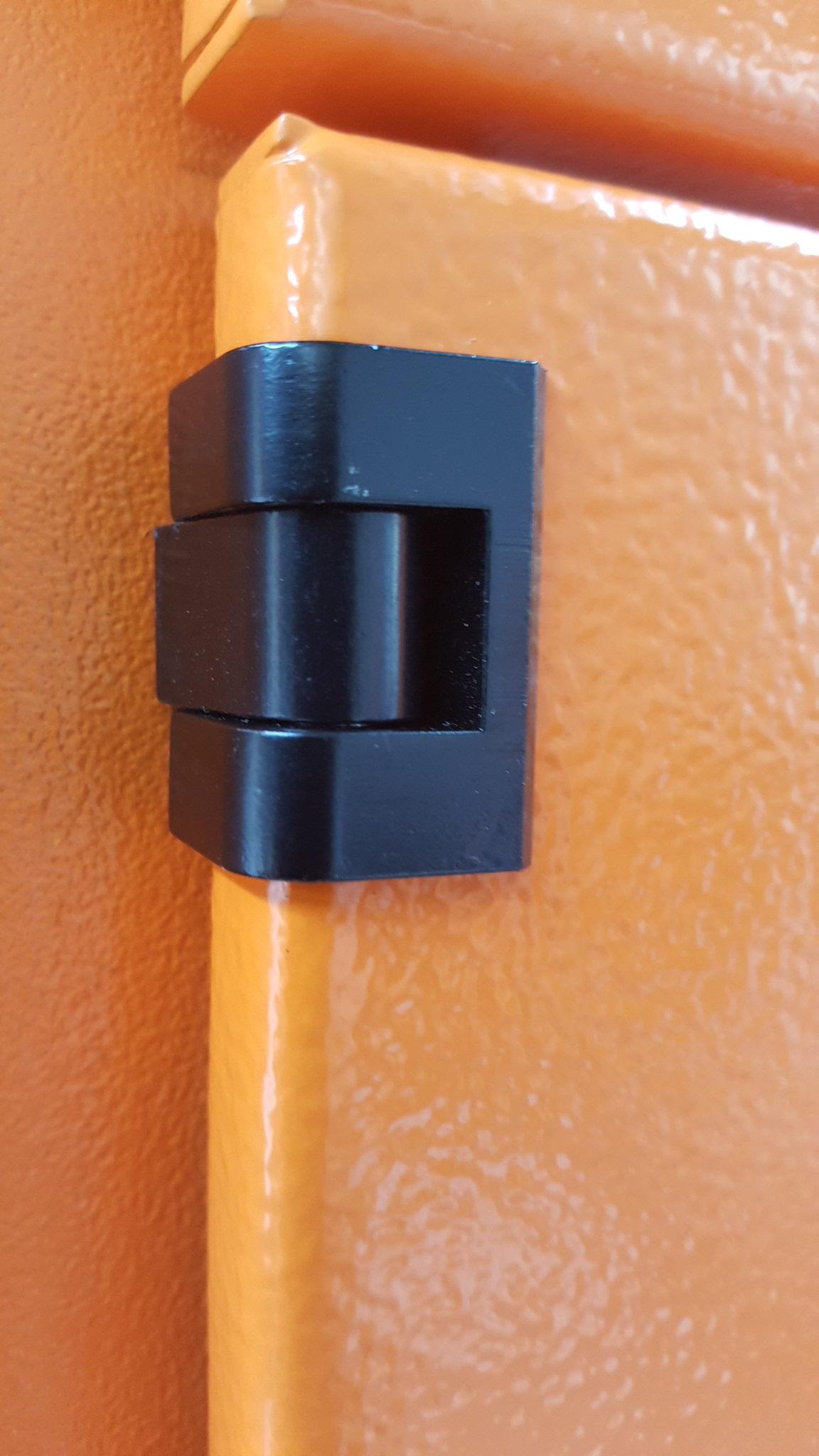
Pintle Hinge installed on a switchboard

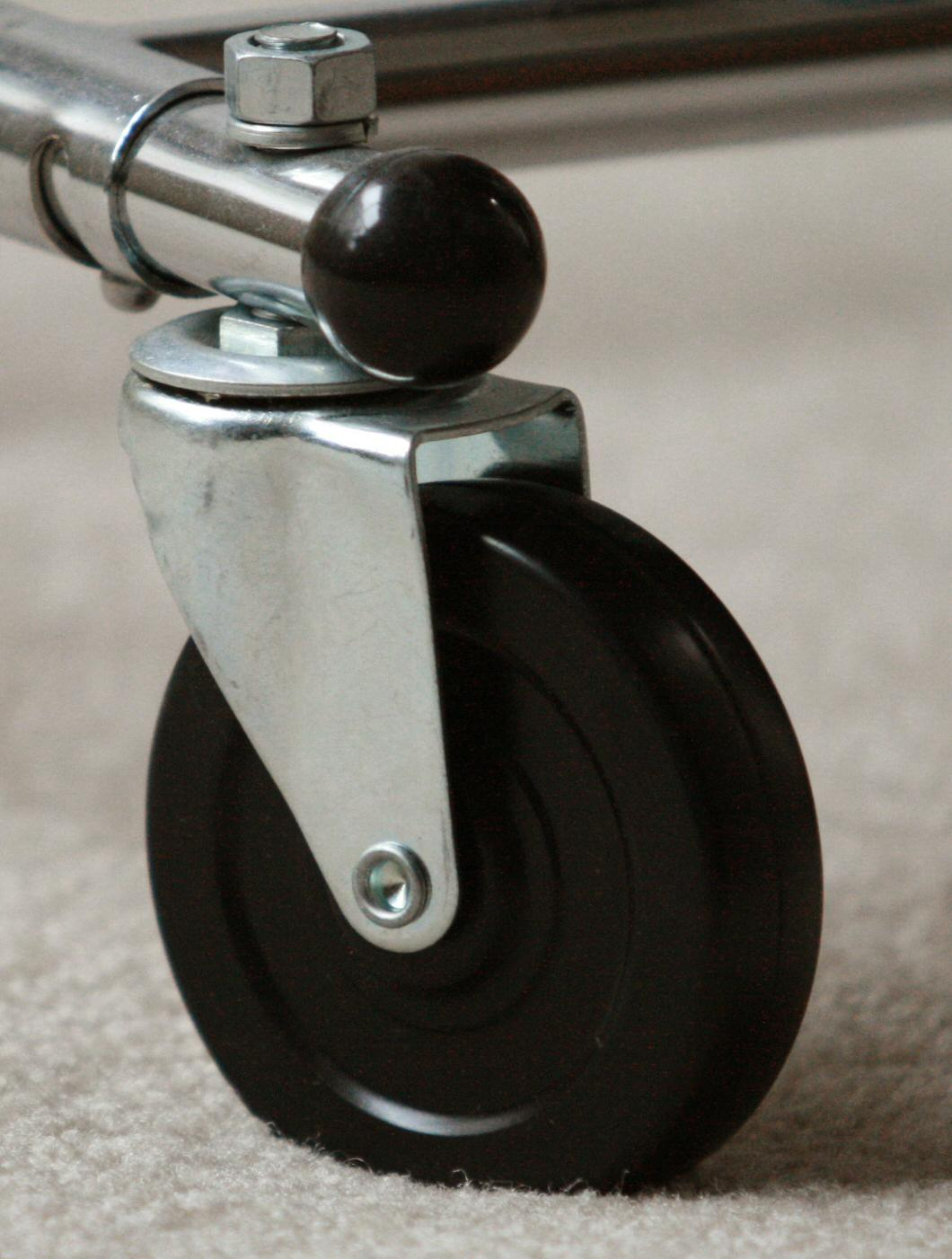
Swivel caster with pintle

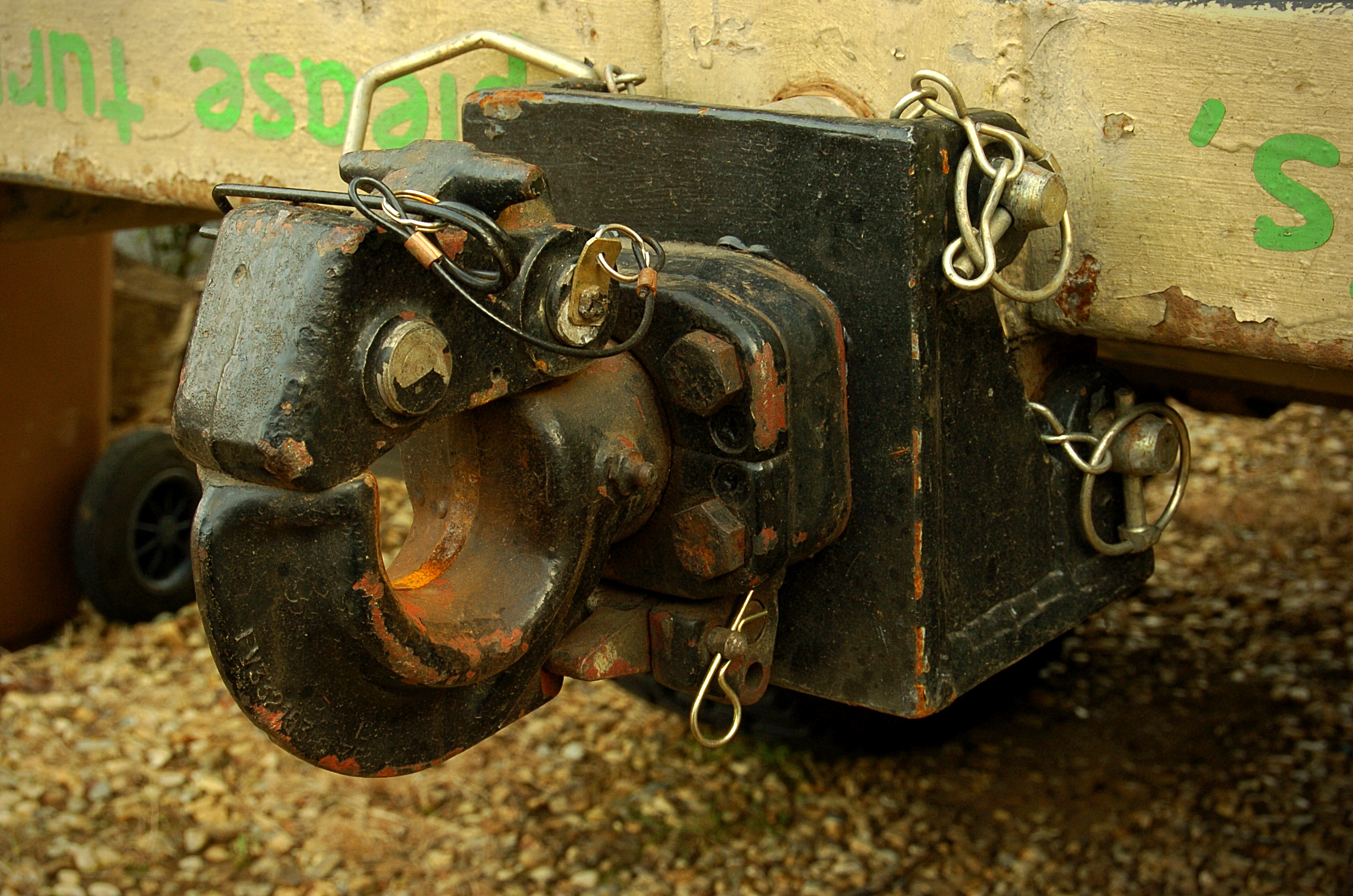
Pintle hook

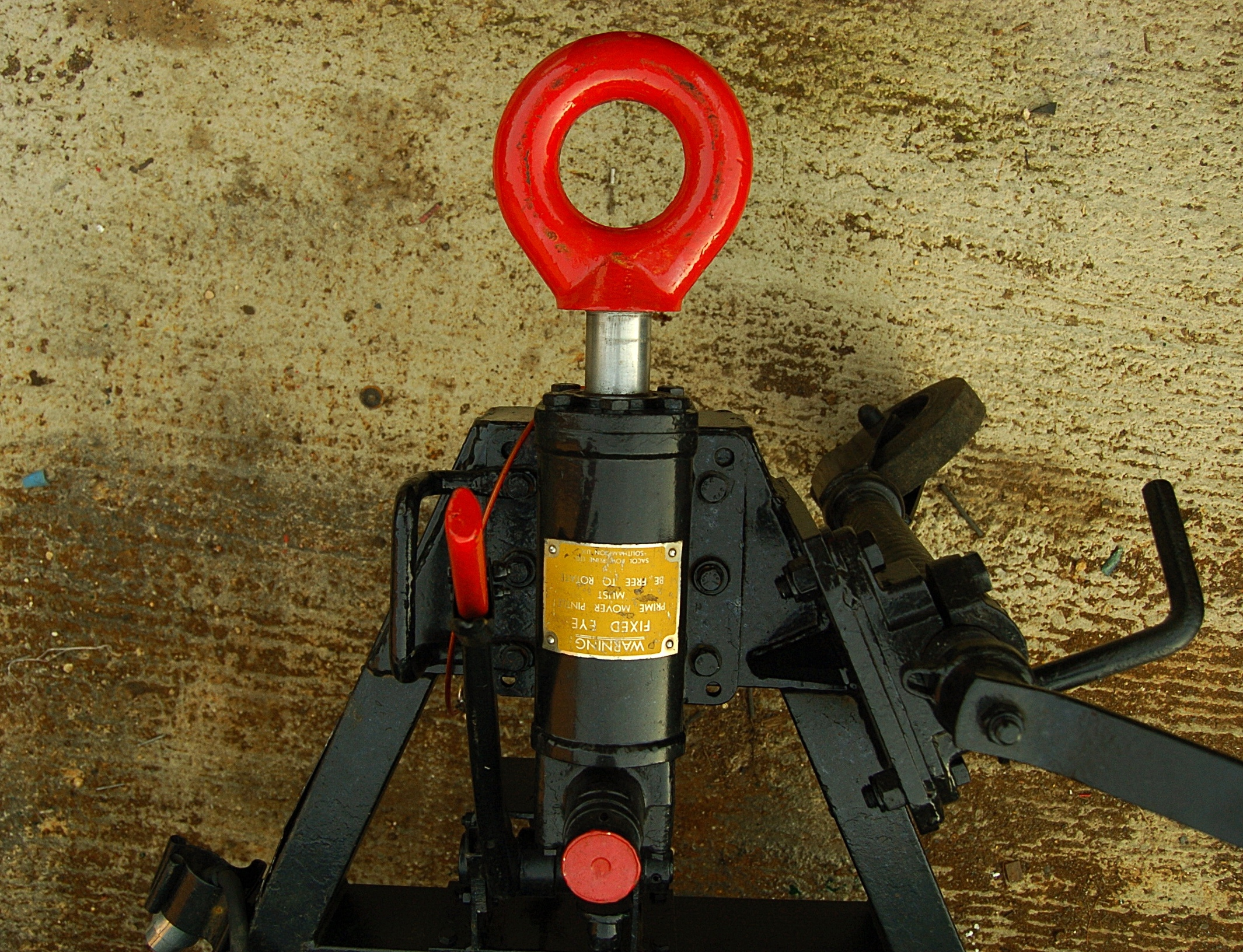
Lunette ring, used with a pintle in heavy towing applications

== See also ==
- Gudgeon
- Hinge
- Pintle hook and lunette ring
- Spindle (automobile)
