= Joseph T. English =

American psychiatrist, academic, and health-care administrator

- Born: May 21, 1933 (age 93); Philadelphia, Pennsylvania
- Education: St. Joseph's University (AB); Jefferson Medical College (MD)

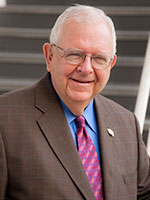
Dr. Joseph T. English, MD

Joseph Thomas English (born May 21, 1933) is an American psychiatrist, academic, and healthcare administrator. He served as the first Chief Psychiatrist of the United States Peace Corps, Administrator of the Health Services and Mental Health Administration in the U.S. Department of Health, Education, and Welfare, and founding President of the New York City Health and Hospitals Corporation.

He later served as Chair of Psychiatry at St. Vincent's Hospital in New York City and as Chair of the Department of Psychiatry and Behavioral Sciences at New York Medical College. He was President of the American Psychiatric Association from 1992 to 1993. He lives in Westchester County, New York.

== Early life and education ==
English was born in Philadelphia, Pennsylvania. He attended St. Joseph's Preparatory School and received his A.B. in Biology from St. Joseph's University in 1954. He earned his M.D. from Jefferson Medical College in 1958, interned at Jefferson Medical College, completed two years of residency at Pennsylvania Hospital, and finished his psychiatric residency as a research fellow at the National Institute of Mental Health in 1962.

== Career ==
=== Peace Corps and federal service ===
English served as a Commissioned Officer in the United States Public Health Service from 1962 to 1966, becoming the first Chief Psychiatrist of the U.S. Peace Corps. He later served as Director of Health Affairs at the Office of Economic Opportunity.

In 1968, he was appointed Administrator of the Health Services and Mental Health Administration in the U.S. Department of Health, Education, and Welfare. He also served three terms (2001-2011) as an AMA appointee to the Joint Commission on Accreditation of Healthcare Organizations (JCAHO).

=== President of New York City Health and Hospitals Corporation ===
In 1970, New York City Mayor John V. Lindsay appointed English as the first President of the New York City Health and Hospitals Corporation (HHC), where he led the newly formed public hospital system until 1973.

He resigned in 1973 and was subsequently named Chairman of Psychiatry at St. Vincent's Hospital and Medical Center.

=== Academic career ===
English served for more than 35 years on the faculty of New York Medical College (NYMC), eventually becoming Chair of the Department of Psychiatry and Behavioral Sciences. He later held the title of Sidney E. Frank Distinguished Professor at NYMC.

He previously served on the teaching staff of George Washington University School of Medicine and Cornell University, and lectured at Harvard and Yale Medical Schools.

=== APA Presidency (1992–1993) ===
As President of the American Psychiatric Association, English led a psychiatric delegation to meet Pope John Paul II in 1993 to discuss mental health and stigma.

=== Other leadership roles ===
English was President and CEO of the New York City Health and Hospitals Corporation, President of the Group for the Advancement of Psychiatry, and Chair of the AMA Section Council on Psychiatry (1996–2001). Upon his retirement from the AMA House of Delegates in 2014, the organization issued a formal resolution recognizing his decades of service.

== Awards ==
English's honors include:

- Meritorious Award for Public Administration, William A. Jump Foundation
- Federal Arthur S. Flemming Award (1968)
- St. Joseph's Preparatory School Hall of Excellence Inductee (2026)
- Numerous professional distinctions across psychiatry and public health

== Personal life ==
English married Ann Carr Sanger of New York in December 1969. They have three children. He resides in Westchester County, New York.
