= Gretchen Campbell =

American physicist

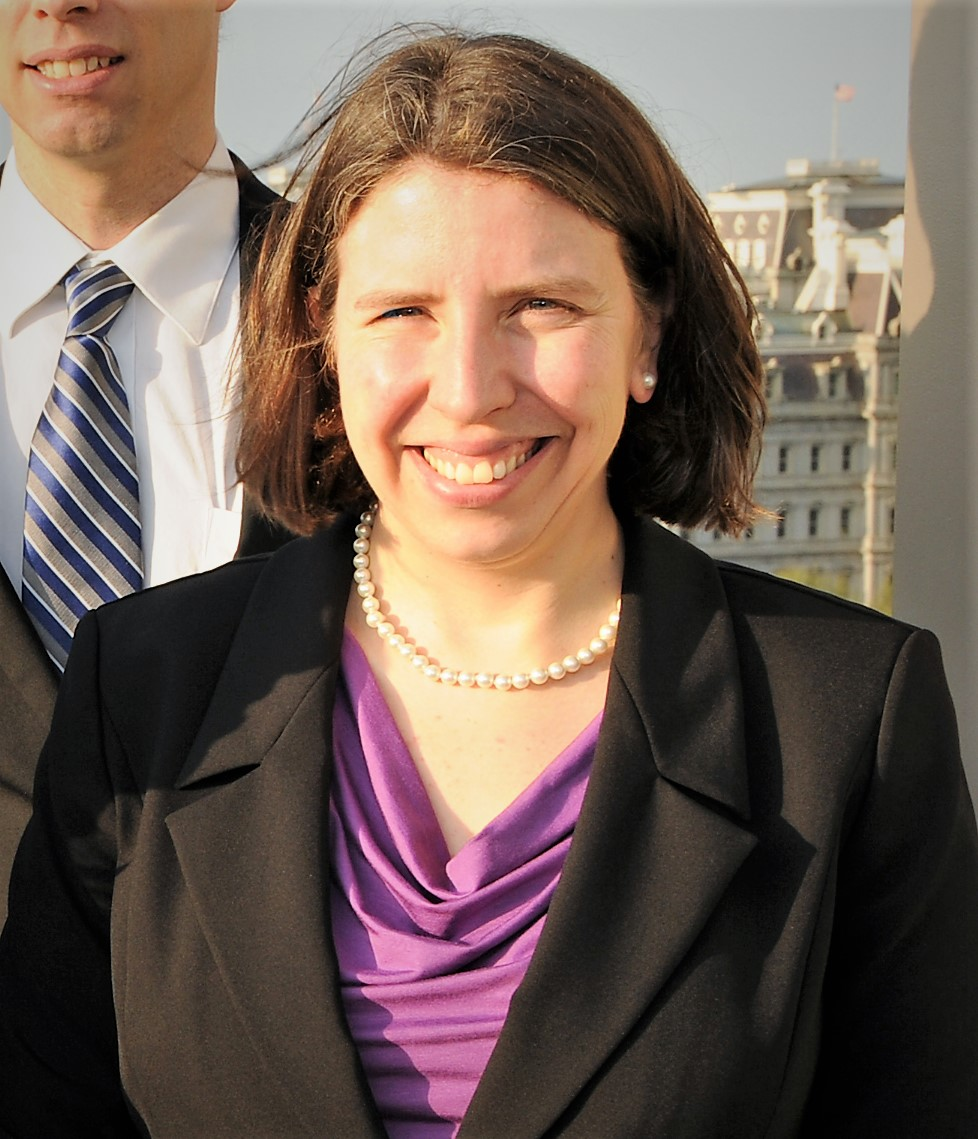
- Campbell in 2014
- Born: c. 1980 (age 45–46)
- Education: Wellesley College; MIT
- Known for: Bose-Einstein condensates; atomtronics
- Awards: Maria Goeppert Mayer Award; Arthur S. Flemming Award; PECASE Award; Department of Commerce Bronze Medal
- Scientific career
- Fields: Physics
- Workplaces: Joint Quantum Institute (NIST / University of Maryland)
- Thesis: ^{87}Rubidium Bose-Einstein condensates in optical lattices (2007)
- Doctoral advisor: Wolfgang Ketterle; David Pritchard
- Website: https://groups.jqi.umd.edu/campbell/

Gretchen K. Campbell (born c. 1980) is an American atomic, molecular, and optical physicist associated with the National Institute of Standards and Technology. She works in the field of atomtronics and has received awards in recognition of her research contributions on Bose-Einstein condensates. She is currently on detail to the White House Office of Science and Technology Policy (WHOSTP), where she is the Assistant Director for Quantum Information Science at WHOSTP, and Director of the National Quantum Coordination Office (NQCO).

== Early life and education ==
Campbell was raised in western New York state and was curious about science from a young age. She attended Wellesley College for her undergraduate degree, initially intending to train as a veterinarian. However, first-year physics lectures by Glenn Stark and lab mentorship from Theodore W. Ducas shifted her interest toward physics. In particular, she enjoyed the physics problem-solving approach which encouraged logic and reasoning rather than memorisation. Her undergraduate honours thesis was on the topic of optical tweezers. She graduated from Wellesley in 2001, then moved to MIT for her PhD. She studied Bose-Einstein condensates in optical lattices and related quantum phase transitions. She finished her degree in 2007 under the supervision of Wolfgang Ketterle and David Pritchard.

== Career and research ==
Between 2007 and 2009, Campbell was a postdoctoral fellow at JILA in the group of Jun Ye. She worked on some of the world's most accurate atomic clocks based on optical transitions of cooled neutral atoms confined by optical lattices.

In 2009, she moved to become a fellow of the Joint Quantum Institute (JQI) affiliation between NIST and the University of Maryland. She became co-director of the institute in 2016. She is part of the Laser Cooling and Trapping group and the Quantum Measurement Division. Campbell manages two laboratories through the JQI collaboration, one at NIST and one on the university campus.

Campbell currently works in atomtronics, an emerging research area into circuitry based on a flow of atoms rather than electrons. She is a leader in the field, with experiments showing promise for applications in sensing or quantum computers. This technology draws on her expertise with Bose-Einstein condensates (BEC) by using sodium BEC rings to create superfluid atom circuits analogous to superconductors. These experiments are quantum in nature, as the rotation velocity of the ring trap flow is quantized. Using a laser to "stir" the BEC can cause transitions between eigenstates. Her contributions have included designing a weak link as an additional circuit component and observation of hysteresis effects. She enjoys conducting impactful, tabletop, ultracold experiments.

Her work on BEC may also have implications for research on the early universe. BEC can be described as a "vacuum state for phonons" similar to the quantum field vacuum preceding early universe expansion. Campbell and her collaborator Stephen Eckel are interested to see if their model can provide insight into Hubble friction when a sound wave perturbs the BEC.

Campbell mentors young scientists and manages a group for women in physics at the JQI. She was involved in the 2020 Conference for Undergraduate Women in Physics which took place there.

== Awards and honours ==
- 2027 Optica Fellow "for pioneering the field of 'atomtronics,' where light creates circuits with atoms as analogs to electrons in electronics".
- 2015 Fellow of the American Physical Society "for pioneering contributions to the study of superfluidity in atomic-gas Bose-Einstein condensates using ring-shaped condensates".
- 2015 Finalist, Emerging Leaders category of the Samuel J. Heyman Service to America Medals. She "advanced the emerging field of physics known as atomtronics, paving the way for a new generation of technologies much like electronics has transformed our society today."
- 2015 IUPAP Young Scientist Prize.
- 2015 Maria Goeppert Mayer Award "for her pioneering contributions to the study of superfluidity in atomic gas Bose-Einstein condensates using ring-shaped condensates, realizing atomic analogs to superconducting and superfluid liquid circuitry, including the use of weak links to create the first closed circuit atomtronic devices."
- 2012 Arthur S. Flemming Award.
- 2012 PECASE Award. She was recognised for her research excellence and her commitment to mentoring young scientists, especially women in physics.
- 2011 Department of Commerce Bronze Medal "for proving the feasibility of atomtronics, a new field of atom-based electronics, by demonstrating the first controllable atom circuit."
- 2008 Finalist DAMOP thesis prize of the American Physical Society.
- 2006 Martin Deutsch Prize For Excellence in Experimental Physics, MIT.
- 2005 OSA New Focus/Bookham Student Award.
- 2001 Phyllis Fleming Physics Prize.

== Personal life ==
Campbell has a daughter who was born in 2015.
