= Ascent propulsion system =

Apollo Lunar Module rocket engine

Ascent propulsion system (APS)
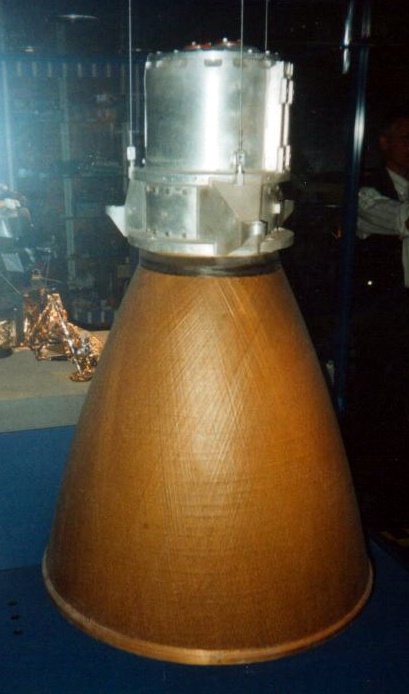
- Apollo LM ascent engine
- Country of origin: United States
- Date: 1964–72
- Manufacturer: Bell Aircraft / Rocketdyne
- Application: Lunar Ascent Stage/Spacecraft propulsion
- Predecessor: Bell 8247
- Successor: RS-18
- Status: Retired

Liquid-fuel engine
- Propellant: N_{2}O_{4} / Aerozine 50
- Mixture ratio: 1.6
- Cycle: Pressure-fed
- Pumps: None

Configuration
- Chamber: 1
- Nozzle ratio: 46

Performance
- Thrust, vacuum: 3,500 pounds-force (16 kN)
- Thrust-to-weight ratio: 16.7 (weight on Earth)
- Chamber pressure: 120 pounds per square inch (8.3 bar)
- Specific impulse, vacuum: 311 seconds (3.05 km/s)
- Burn time: 200 seconds
- Restarts: Designed for 1 restarts

Dimensions
- Length: 46 inches (120 cm)
- Diameter: 31 inches (79 cm)
- Dry mass: 209.1 pounds (94.8 kg)

Used in
- Lunar module as ascent engine

The ascent propulsion system (APS) or lunar module ascent engine (LMAE) is a fixed-thrust hypergolic rocket engine developed by Bell Aerosystems for use in the Apollo Lunar Module ascent stage. It used Aerozine 50 fuel, and N_{2}O_{4} oxidizer. Rocketdyne provided the injector system, at the request of NASA, when Bell could not solve combustion instability problems.

== Origins ==
The LMAE traces its origin to the earlier Bell Aerosystems engines (8096, 8247) used in the RM-81 Agena, the rocket upper stage and satellite support bus developed by Lockheed initially for the canceled WS-117L reconnaissance satellite program. The Agena served as an upper stage for several defense, intelligence, and exploration programs: SAMOS-E, SAMOS-F (ELINT Ferret) and MIDAS (Missile Defense Alarm System) military early-warning satellites, Corona photo intelligence program, and the Ranger and Lunar Orbiter lunar probes.

The Lockheed Agena target vehicle using the Bell 8247 engine was qualified for 15 restarts for NASA's Project Gemini.

A total of 365 Agena rockets were launched by NASA and the U.S. Air Force between February 28, 1959, and the last Agena D launched on 12 February 1987, configured as the upper stage of a Titan 34B.

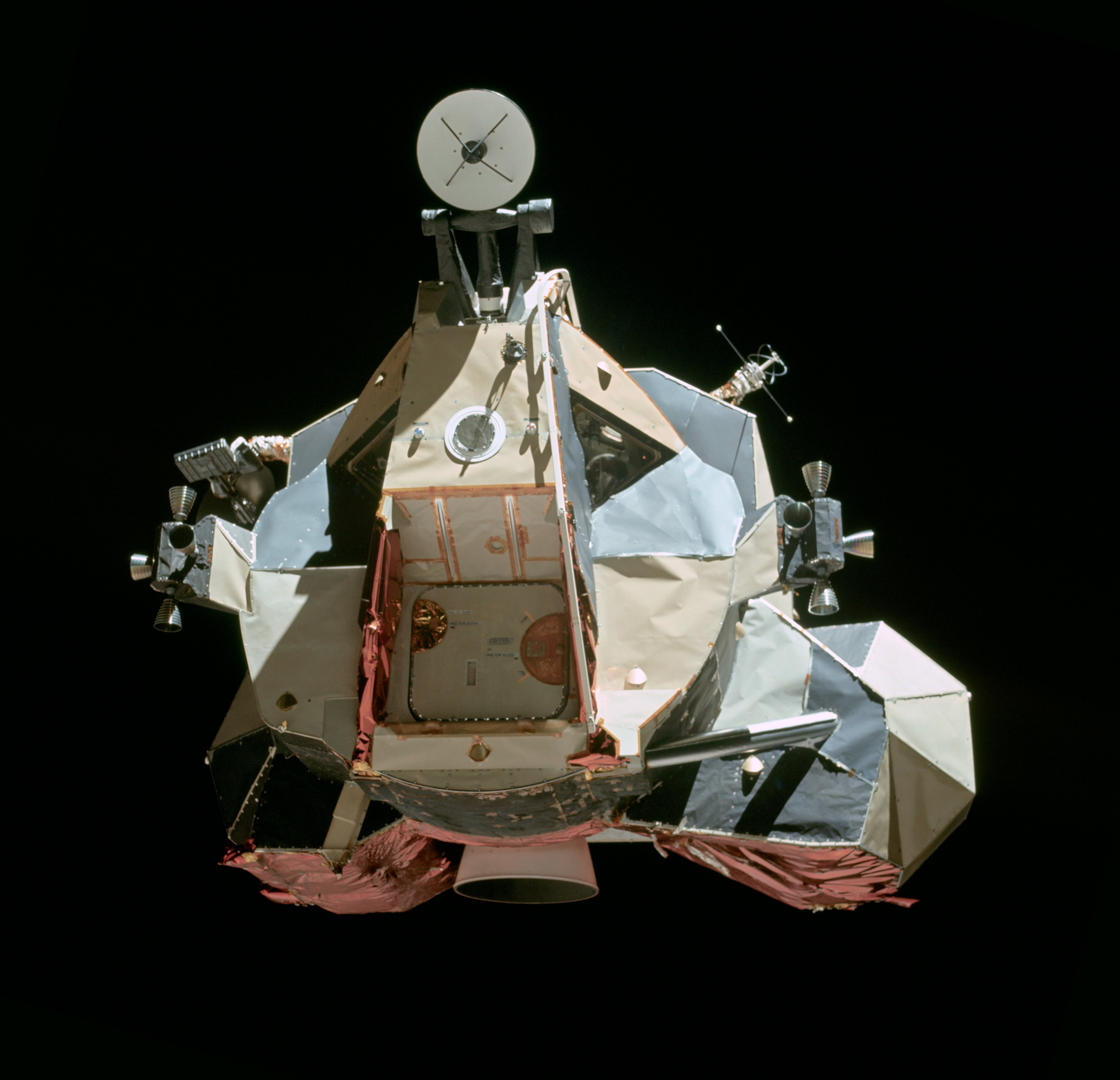
Apollo 17 LM Ascent Stage

== Development ==
During the spring of 1963, Grumman hired Bell to develop the lunar module ascent engine, on the assumption that Bell's experience in development of the Air Force Agena engine would be transferable to the lunar module requirements. Grumman placed heavy emphasis upon high reliability through simplicity of design, and the ascent engine emerged as the least complicated of the three main engines in the Apollo space vehicle, including the LM descent and CSM service propulsion system engines.

Embodying a pressure-fed fuel system using hypergolic (self-igniting) propellants, the ascent engine was fixed-thrust and nongimbaled, capable of lifting the ascent stage off the Moon or aborting a landing if necessary.

The engine developed about 1,600 pounds-force (7.1 kN) of thrust, which produced a velocity of 3,200 meters per second from lunar launch, to LOR, and CM docking.

Lunar ascent by Apollo 17 ascent stage.

== RS-18 Engine ==
Rocketdyne brought the lunar module ascent engine out of its 36-year retirement in 2008 for NASA's Exploration Systems Architecture Study (ESAS) engine testing, re-designated it as RS-18, and reconfigured the non-throttleable engine to use LOX/methane.
