= RS-18 =

American rocket engine

- Country of origin: USA
- Manufacturer: Rocketdyne
- Application: Upper stage/Spacecraft propulsion
- Predecessor: Bell / Rocketdyne LMAE
- Status: Development Paused

Liquid-fuel engine
- Propellant: LOX / Liquid Methane (CH_{4})
- Cycle: Pressure-fed engine

Configuration
- Chamber: 1

Performance
- Thrust, vacuum: 24.5 kN (5,500 lbf)

Used in
- Development Planned for Altair (spacecraft)

The RS-18 is a reconfigured version of the Rocketdyne Lunar Module Ascent Engine (LMAE), modified to burn liquid oxygen (LOX) and liquid methane (CH_{4}) for NASA's Exploration Systems Architecture Study (ESAS) engine testing in 2008.

== Development ==
The 2005 NASA Exploration Systems Architecture Study (ESAS), part of the 2004 Vision for Space Exploration, recommended that the crew exploration vehicle (CEV) lunar surface access module (LSAM) ascent stage propulsion and service module propulsion systems employ a pressure-fed LOX/liquid methane (CH_{4}) engine.

"Green" propellants, such as LOX and liquid methane, offer savings in both performance and safety over equivalently sized hypergolic propulsion systems in spacecraft applications such as ascent engines or service module engines.

The mass savings over monomethyl hydrazine (MMH) and nitrogen tetroxide (N_{2}O_{4}) were around 1,000 - 2,000 lb (450 – 910 kg) for the LSAM ascent module, which was larger than the current design.

The thrust levels identified in ESAS were 5,000 - 10,000 lbf (22 - 44 kN) for the ascent engine.

To remove key technology risks in the decision for hypergolic or LOX/Methane, the Propulsion and Cryogenics Advanced Development (PCAD) project is being conducted within NASA, led by the Glenn Research Center, for 5,500 lbf (24,500 N) ascent engine technology.

== Progress ==
The RS-18 rocket engine was tested using LOX and liquid methane under simulated altitude conditions at NASA Johnson Space Center White Sands Test Facility (WSTF). This project is part of NASA's Propulsion and Cryogenics Advanced Development (PCAD) project.

Altitude simulation was achieved using the WSTF Large Altitude Simulation System, which provided altitude conditions equivalent up to —122,000 ft (~ 37 km). The RS-18 gas spark-torch igniters were designed and supplied by Pratt and Whitney Rocketdyne as part of the LOX/Methane RS-18 test program. Pyrotechnic ignition was not attempted on the RS-18, but was subsequently successfully demonstrated as part of the 2009 Armadillo Aerospace IPP engine testing.

The RS-18 engine was not selected for the Constellation program, and that NASA program was eventually cancelled on February 1, 2010.
