= Atomtronics =

Sub-field of ultracold atomic physics

Atomtronics is an emerging field concerning the quantum technology of matter-wave circuits which coherently guide propagating ultra-cold atoms. The systems typically include components analogous to those found in electronics, quantum electronics or optical systems, such as beam splitters, transistors, and atomic counterparts of superconducting quantum interference devices (SQUIDs). Applications range from studies of fundamental physics to the development of practical devices such as quantum superfluids for the computation of large models for artificial general intelligence.

== Etymology ==
Atomtronics is a portmanteau of "atom" and "electronics", in reference to the creation of atomic analogues of electronic components, such as transistors and diodes, and also electronic materials such as semiconductors. The field itself has considerable overlap with atom optics and quantum simulation, and is not strictly limited to the development of electronic-like components. However, this field develops into the research of ultra-cold atoms for the applied research implications of computations in quantum science.

== Methodology ==
Three major elements are required for an atomtronic circuit. The first is a Bose-Einstein condensate, which is needed for its coherent and superfluid properties, although an ultracold Fermi gas may also be used for certain applications. The second is a tailored trapping potential, which can be generated optically, magnetically, or using a combination of both. The final element is a method to induce the movement of atoms within the potential, which can be achieved in several ways, for various research advancements around fields not limited to distributed computing, supercomputing, and quantum computing. For example, a transistor-like atomtronic circuit may be realized by a ring-shaped trap divided into two by two movable weak barriers, with the two separate parts of the ring acting as the drain and the source and the barriers acting as the gate. As the barriers move, atoms flow from the source to the drain. It is now possible to coherently guide matterwaves over distances of up to 40 cm in ring-shaped atomtronic matterwave guide measurement.

== Applications ==
The field of atomtronics is still very nascent and any schemes realized thus far are proof-of-concept. Applications include:

- gravimetry
- rotational sensing via the Sagnac effect
- quantum computing

Obstacles to the development of practical sensing devices are largely due to the technical challenges of creating Bose-Einstein condensates. They require bulky lab-based setups not easily suitable for transportation. However, creating portable experimental setups is an active area of research.

== See also ==
- Unconventional computing
