= List of synchrotron radiation facilities =

This is a table of synchrotrons and storage rings used as synchrotron radiation sources, and free electron lasers.

Facility name	Location	Country	Energy (GeV)	Circumference or length (m)	Commissioned for synchrotron radiation studies	Decommissioned
National Synchrotron Light Source (NSLS-II)	Brookhaven National Laboratory	US	3	792	2015	
Synchrotron Ultraviolet Radiation Facility (SURF)	National Institute of Standards and Technology, Gaithersburg, Maryland	US	0.18		1961	
SURF II storage ring, Synchrotron Ultraviolet Radiation Facility	National Institute of Standards and Technology, Gaithersburg, Maryland	US	0.25		1974	
SURF III Synchrotron Ultraviolet Radiation Facility	National Institute of Standards and Technology, Gaithersburg, Maryland	US	0.416	5.27	2000	
Frascati Synchrotron Radiation Collaboration	1 GeV electronsynchrotron (built in 1958) at Laboratori Nazionali di Frascati	Italy	1	12	1963	1970
Institute for Nuclear Studies-Electron Synchrotron (INS-ES)	Tokyo	Japan	0.75	34.78	1965	1997
Institute for Nuclear Studies-Synchrotron Orbital Radiation (INS-SOR)	Tokyo	Japan	0.5	17.4	1974	1997
DESY (Deutsches Elektronen Synchrotron)	DESY	Germany	7.4		1967	1987
DORIS (Doppel-Ring-Speicher)	DESY	Germany	3.5 (5 in 1978)	289	1974	1993
DORIS III	DESY	Germany	5	289	1993	2012
PETRA II	DESY	Germany	12	2304	1995	2007
PETRA III	DESY	Germany	6.0	2304	2009	
European X-ray Free Electron Laser (EuXFEL)	Schenefeld, near DESY	Germany	17.5	3400	2017	
Tantalus at the Synchrotron Radiation Center	University of Wisconsin	US	0.24	9.38	1968	1987
Synchrotron Radiation Center(SRC)	University of Wisconsin	US	1	121	1987	2014
Solidi Roma Synchrotron Radiation Facility	Recycled 1GeV electronsynchrotron at Laboratori Nazionali di Frascati	Italy	1	12	1972	1975
Stanford Synchrotron Radiation Lightsource (SSRL)	SPEAR storage ring at SLAC National Accelerator Laboratory	US	3	234	1973	
Linac Coherent Light Source (LCLS)	SLAC National Accelerator Laboratory	US	8	3000	2007	
Anneau de Collisions d'Orsay (ACO)	Orsay	France	0.54		1973	1988
Cornell High Energy Synchrotron Source (CHESS)	Cornell University, Ithaca, NY	US	6.0	768	1979	
Progetto Utilizzazione Luce di Sincrotrone (PULS)	recycled Adone storage ring with wiggler (built in 1968) at Laboratori Nazionali di Frascati	Italy	1.5	33.5	1980	1993
Synchrotron Radiation Source	Daresbury Laboratory	UK	2	96	1981	2008
DCI storage ring – LURE (Laboratoire pour l'Utilisation du Rayonnement Electromagnétique)	Orsay	France	1		1981	2006
National Synchrotron Light Source (NSLS)	Brookhaven National Laboratory	US	2.8	170	1982	2014
Photon Factory (PF) at KEK	Tsukuba	Japan	2.5	187	1982	
Super ACO-Laboratoire pour l'Utilisation du Rayonnement Electromagnétique (LURE)	Orsay	France	0.8		1987	2006
ASTRID	Aarhus University	Denmark	0.58	40	1991	2012
ASTRID 2	Aarhus University	Denmark	0.58	45.7	2013	
National Synchrotron Radiation Laboratory (NSRL)	University of Science and Technology China, Hefei	China	0.8	66.13	1991	
Beijing Synchrotron Radiation Facility (BSRF)	Institute of High Energy Physics, Chinese Academy of Sciences, Beijing	China	2.5		1991	
European Synchrotron Radiation Facility (ESRF)	Grenoble	France	6	844	1992	2019
European Synchrotron Radiation Facility – Extremely Brilliant Source (ESRF-EBS)	Grenoble	France	6	844	2020	
Advanced Light Source (ALS)	Lawrence Berkeley Laboratory	US	1.9	196.8	1993	
ELETTRA	Trieste	Italy	2–2.4	260	1993	
Advanced Photon Source (APS)	Argonne National Laboratory, Lemont, IL	US	7.0	1104	1995	
Kurchatov Synchrotron Radiation Source (SIBIR-1, SIBIR-2)	Kurchatov Institute, Moscow	Russia	2.5	124	1999	
LNLS	LNLS in Campinas, São Paulo	Brazil	1.37	93.2	1997	2019
SPring-8	RIKEN	Japan	8	1436	1997	
MAX-I	MAX-lab	Sweden	0.55	30	1986	2015
MAX-II	MAX-lab	Sweden	1.5	90	1997	2015
MAX-III	MAX-lab	Sweden	0.7	36	2008	2015
MAX IV 1.5 GeV Storage Ring	MAX IV	Sweden	1.5	96	2016	
MAX IV 3 GeV Storage Ring	MAX IV	Sweden	3	528	2016	
BESSY II	Helmholtz-Zentrum Berlin in Berlin	Germany	1.7	240	1998	
Indus 1	Raja Ramanna Centre for Advanced Technology, Indore	India	0.45	18.96	1999	
DAFNE light	Istituto Nazionale di Fisica Nucleare, Frascati	Italy	0.51	32	1999	
Karlsruhe Research Accelerator (KARA)	Karlsruhe Institute of Technology	Germany	2.5	110.4	2000	
Swiss Light Source	Paul Scherrer Institute	Switzerland	2.4	288	2001	
SwissFEL	Paul Scherrer Institute	Switzerland			2018	
Canadian Light Source	University of Saskatchewan	Canada	2.9	171	2004	
Synchrotron Light Research Institute (SLRI)	Nakhon Ratchasima	Thailand	1.2	81.4	2004	
Indus 2	Raja Ramanna Centre for Advanced Technology, Indore	India	2.5	173	2005	
Australian Synchrotron	Melbourne	Australia	3	216	2006	
SOLEIL	Saint-Aubin, Essonne	France	2.75	354	2006	
Diamond Light Source	Rutherford Appleton Laboratory	UK	3	561.6	2006	
Shanghai Synchrotron Radiation Facility (SSRF)	Shanghai	China	3.5	432	2007	
High Energy Photon Source (HEPS)	Institute of High Energy Physics, Chinese Academy of Sciences, Beijing	China	6	1360.4	2026	
Taiwan Light Source	National Synchrotron Radiation Research Center, Hsinchu Science Park	Taiwan	1.5	120	1993	
Taiwan Photon Source	National Synchrotron Radiation Research Center, Hsinchu Science Park	Taiwan)	3	518.4	2015	
Metrology Light Source (MLS)	Berlin	Germany	0.6	48	2008	
Beijing Electron–Positron Collider II (BEPC II)	Institute of High Energy Physics, Chinese Academy of Sciences, Beijing	China	3.7	240	2008	
ALBA	Barcelona Synchrotron Park, Cerdanyola del Vallès near Barcelona	Spain	3	270	2010	
Sirius	LNLS in Campinas, São Paulo	Brazil	3	518.2	2018	
Synchrotron-Light for Experimental Science and Applications in the Middle East (SESAME)	Al Balqa	Jordan	2.5	133	2016	
Iranian Light Source Facility (ILSF)	Qazvin	Iran	3	489.6	Under Design	
Center for Advanced Microstructures and Devices (CAMD)	LSU, Louisiana	US	1.5			
Pohang Light Source II	Pohang University of Science and Technology	South Korea	3.0	281.82	2011	
CANDLE	Yerevan	Armenia			proposed	
Centre Laser Infrarouge d'Orsay (CLIO)	Laboratoire de Chimie Physique (LCP), Orsay	France	0.04		1991	
DELTA	Technical University of Dortmund	Germany	1.5	115.2	1999	
Hiroshima Synchrotron Radiation Center (HSRC)	Hiroshima University, Hiroshima	Japan	0.7	22	1997	
Institute of Free Electron Laser (iFEL)	Osaka University, Osaka	Japan				
IR FEL Research Center (FELSUT)	Tokyo University of Science	Japan				
Medical Synchrotron Radiation Facility	National Institute of Radiological Sciences, Inage-ku, Chiba	Japan				
Aichi Synchrotron Radiation Center (AichiSR)	Knowledge Hub Aichi	Japan	1.2	72	2012	
Photonics Research Institute	Tsukuba Science City	Japan				
SAGA Light Source (SAGA-LS)	Tosu, Saga	Japan	1.4	75.6	2006	
Ultraviolet Synchrotron Orbital Radiation Facility (UVSOR)	National Institutes of Natural Sciences, Okazaki	Japan	0.75	53.2	1983	
VSX Light Source	University of Tokyo	Japan				
Free Electron Laser for Infrared eXperiments (FELIX)	Radboud University, Nijmegen	Netherlands	0.015–0.060		1991	
Dubna Electron Synchrotron (DELSY)	JINR, Dubna	Russia				
Siberian Synchrotron Radiation Centre (SSRC)	Budker Institute of Nuclear Physics, Novosibirsk	Russia	2–6	366	1973	
Technical Storage Ring Complex (TNK)	F.V Lukin Institute, Zelenograd, Moscow	Russia	0.45–2.2			
Singapore Synchrotron Light Source (SSLS)	National University of Singapore	Singapore	0.7	10.8	2000	
Solaris (synchrotron)	Kraków	Poland	1.5	96	2016	
UCSB Center for Terahertz Science and Technology (CTST)	University of California, Santa Barbara, Santa Barbara, California	US				
Duke Free Electron Laser Laboratory (DFELL)	Duke University, Durham, North Carolina	US	0.2–1.2	107.46	1994	
Jefferson Laboratory Free Electron Laser (Jlab)	Thomas Jefferson National Accelerator Facility, Newport News, Virginia	US				
W. M. Keck Vanderbilt Free-electron Laser Center	Vanderbilt University, Nashville, Tennessee	US				
The African Light Source (AfLS)					Conceptual stage	
Synchrotron Radiation Center, Ritsumeikan University (Ritsumeikan SR Center: RSRC)	Ritsumeikan University	Japan	0.585	3.14	1996	
NanoTerasu (JASRI, QST, PhoSIC)	Sendai	Japan	3	349	2024	
Siberian Circular Photon Source (SKIF)	Budker Institute of Nuclear Physics	Russia	3	476	2025	
