= Yves Petroff =

French director and scientist

Yves Petroff is a French scientist and the former director of the Laboratório Nacional de Luz Síncrotron in Campinas, Brazil, where he oversaw the completion of Sirius, among the first synchrotron light sources to feature a diffraction-limited storage ring.

Petroff completed his PhD at the Ecole normale supérieure, before becoming a National Science Foundation Fellow in the Department of Physics at the University of California, Berkeley from 1971 to 1974. He then moved back to France in Orsay to start the first beamline on the ACO storage ring. In 1976 he became a senior researcher (Directeur de Recherche) at CNRS, and was the director of the LURE synchrotron from 1980 to 1990. In 1993 he became the scientific director of the European Synchrotron Radiation Facility (ESRF) until 2001. From 2003 to 2005 he was the president of the International Union of Pure and Applied Physics (IUPAP) and deputy director in the French Ministry of Research. He has been the Scientific Director of LNLS in Campinas, Brazil from 2009 to 2013, and became director of LNLS in 2018.
