= Synchrotron radiation circular dichroism spectroscopy =

Synchrotron Radiation Circular Dichroism

Synchrotron radiation circular dichroism spectroscopy, commonly referred to as SRCD and also known as VUV-circular dichroism or VUVCD spectroscopy, is a powerful extension to the technique of circular dichroism (CD) spectroscopy, often used to study structural properties of biological molecules such as proteins and nucleic acids. The physical principles of SRCD are essentially identical to those of CD, in that the technique measures the difference in absorption (ΔA) of left (A_{L}) and right (A_{R}) circularly polarized light (ΔA=A_{L}-A_{R}) by a sample in solution. To obtain a CD(SRCD) spectrum the sample must be innately optically active (chiral), or, in some way be induced to have chiral properties, as only then will there be an observable difference in absorption of the left and right circularly polarized light. The major advantages of SRCD over CD arise from the ability to measure data over an extended wavelength range into the vacuum ultra violet (VUV) end of the spectrum. As these measurements are utilizing a light source with a higher photon flux (quantity of light stricking a given surface area) than a bench-top CD machine it means data are more accurate at these extended wavelengths because there is a larger signal over the background noise (the signal-to-noise ratio) and, generally, less sample is needed when recording the spectra and there is more information content available in the data. Many beamlines now exist around the world to enable the measurement of SRCD data.

== Origins ==
Extending the wavelength range for CD experiments had been both considered and instigated as far back as 1970. Three research groups had created their own "in-house" CD machines, with specialist lamps as their light source, to enable measurements in this range. Synchrotron radiation (SR) had been proposed for use as the light source at a meeting in Brookhaven National Laboratory on Long Island in 1972, however, it took a few years more before this came to fruition. Two research papers in 1980 reported the collection of CD data using SR as the light source for the experiments. Specifically, spectra were obtained in wavelength regions into the VUV range, from ~100 nanometers (nm) to ~200 nm, largely unavailable to laboratory-based bench-top spectrophotometers. Sutherland et al. focussed on the development of a versatile spectrophotometer capable of measuring CD, amongst other properties, in the VUV region of the spectrum, while Snyder and Rowe collected CD data from a small organic compound in the wavelength range 130.5 nm to 205 nm.

== Simplified overview of an SRCD beamline setup ==
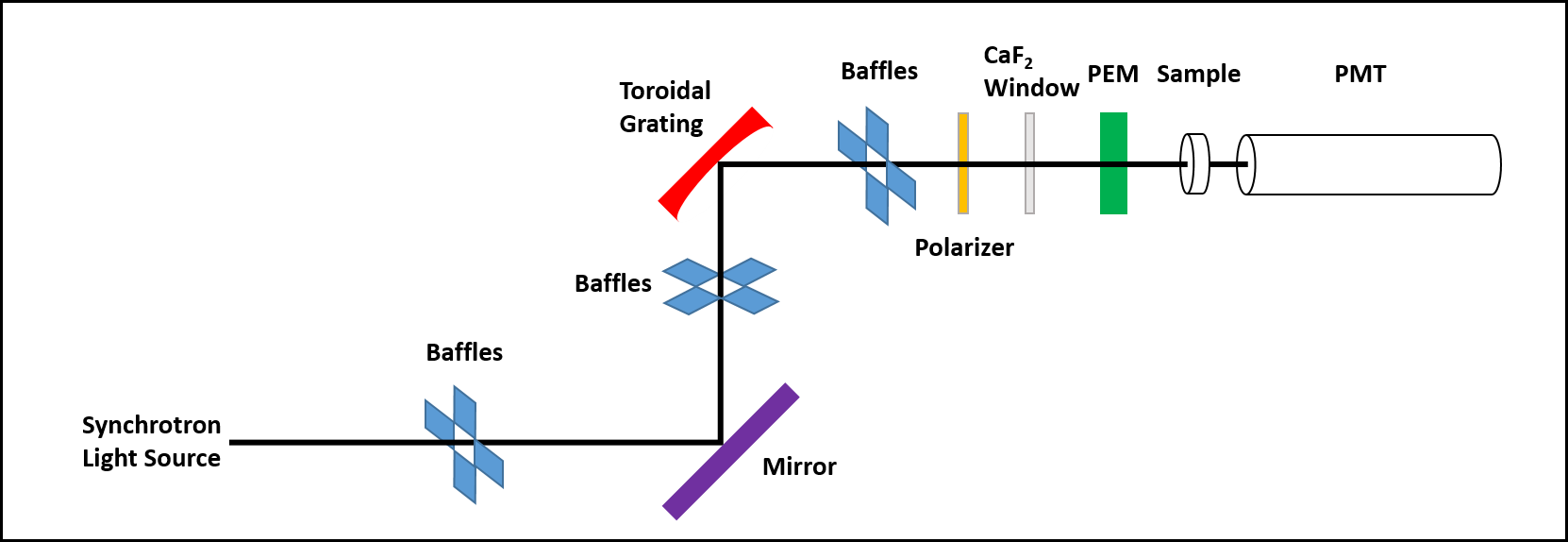

As shown in the diagram, a number of baffles are used throughout to remove possible stray light being reflected off the sides of the beamline tube. The use of only one mirror minimizes the loss of photon flux which is most important in the VUV region where reflectivity is poor relative to the visible wavelength range.

The first constructed SRCD beamlines initially tried to utilize the intrinsic properties of the SR radiation produced, whereby there exists a "central" linearly-polarized component with, above and below this, equally opposing regions of circularly-polarized components. The premise for this was that the overall signal produced from a chiral sample would be enhanced by the absorption difference (the signal) derived from these circularly polarized features of the beam. In an ideal situation this approach would work; however, this setup was modified such that all beamlines now include a linear polarizer (as shown) to remove these circularly polarized components. This was because even the minutest of movements in beam position (beam drift) led to unequal matching of the contributions of the circularly polarized components striking the sample and this, in turn, meant the SRCD signal produced was inaccurate and unreliable; often being irreproducible as a result. Whereas cCD machines are purged throughout with nitrogen to minimize the absorption by oxygen of the light from the source xenon arc lamp, in an SRCD arrangement the beam passes through a calcium fluoride (CaF_{2}), or similar "VUV-wavelengths transparent", window where everything before this point is in vacuum, and everything beyond is in nitrogen. The beam interacts with a photoelastic modulator (PEM) which consequently produces an alternating right- then left-circularly polarized beam and these now interact with the sample. The resultant absorption difference by the sample is measured and amplified by a photomultiplier tube (PMT) and from this the SRCD spectrum is recorded. The wavelength range that is utilized for SRCD studies is typically in the UV to VUV region and can go to below this; potentially from ~100 nm, up to the visible region, ~400 nm. The exact range over which data can be collected relies on the beamline set up, the sample preparation and the wavelength range of the PMT detector used. One of the primary factors limiting the lower wavelength cut off is the sample usually being in solution as a large water absorption band exists centred ~167 nm. This high absorption background swamps any possibility of measuring the very small CD difference signal, although use of deuterated water (D_{2}O) as the solvent reduces the solvent absorption increasing the lower wavelength data collection range by ~10 nm. Removing the solvating water completely, creating a film as a result, means that data can be recorded to significantly lower wavelengths, down to around ~130 nm.

== Advantages over conventional CD machines ==
The main advantages for SRCD over lab-based cCD machines arise from the use of the synchrotron light emission as the source. A number of biologically interesting absorption bands are found in the region between ~170 nm and ~350 nm. For proteins these come from their secondary and tertiary structures, while structural bands for nucleic acids, (DNA and RNA), and saccharides are also located in this region. However, for cCD machines the photon flux from the source reduces by around two orders of magnitude in the wavelength range from 250 nm down to 180 nm, exactly in the region of most significance for these biological molecules. By contrast, typically, the photon flux for an SRCD beamline in this region is at least three orders of magnitude higher than a cCD machine, retaining that level down to ~150 nm. The increased flux means the measured signals from the sample will be increased relative to the background noise, so there is a significant improvement in the signal-to-noise ratio of the sample. This will improve the accuracy of the data recorded meaning interpretation can be undertaken with more confidence in the results. A further advantage of the increased flux is that the concentration of the sample can be reduced while still retaining a significant increase in signal strength, so samples that are difficult to produce in quantity have more chance of producing usable CD data from SRCD rather than a cCD machine. Increasing the lower wavelength range provides more spectral data for analysis which means there is more information content available in that data, meaning that more parameters, here secondary structure features in the protein structure, can be accurately determined.

== Technique growth and development ==
While the first reports of its use dated to 1980, it was a further two decades before the technique of SRCD took off largely due to the work of Bonnie Wallace at Birkbeck College, University of London. From around 2000, her aims in the field focused on both enhancing the collection of quality data through technical improvements, and on demonstrating "proof-of-principle" application studies, illustrating the novel information that SRCD offers. The construction on the Synchrotron Radiation Source (SRS) of the CD12 beamline at Daresbury Laboratory, opened in 2005 under the auspices of the Centre for Protein and Membrane Structure and Dynamics (CPMSD) of which Wallace was the Director, represented the first of the new, dedicated, second-generation SRCD beamlines. It was quickly identified that the high photon flux from CD12 was causing denaturation of the protein sample but that this was resolvable by reducing the sample area being irradiated. Later studies have identified the flux threshold limits that induce SRCD protein denaturation. The input from the Wallace lab to the early years of SRCD development also included the introduction of calibration and standardization of SRCD and cCD spectrophotometers, the creation of software to process the spectral data using CDtool, and CDtoolX, and to analyse the data using DichroWeb, and the generation of reference data sets of proteins to support these data analyses. Additionally, her lab produced sample cells with reduced pathlengths, and using material, (CaF_{2}), transparent to VUV radiation which significantly enhanced the collection of data into the SRCD lower wavelength regions.

New SRCD beamlines were constructed on various synchrotrons around the world. "ASTRID". ring, in the Department of Physics and Astronomy of Aarhus University in Denmark, became a dedicated second-generation synchrotron in 2005. Ultimately this ring had two SRCD beamlines, UV1 and CD1, which migrated to the new third-generation ring, ASTRID2, in 2013/14, as AU-UV and AU-CD. SOLEIL synchrotron, near Paris, France, commissioned a dedicated SRCD beamline, DISCO, around 2005. At Hiroshima Synchrotron Radiation Center, also known as HiSOR, a VUVCD beamline was constructed over the same period, while a little later in 2009, an SRCD beamline was commissioned in Beijing, China. This particular beamline is unique in that the synchrotron which acts as its light source is also the electron carrying ring of the Beijing Electron Positron Collider. The SRS closed in 2008 being superseded in the UK by the Diamond Light Source on which an SRCD beamline opened for use in 2010. With the SRS closure the CD12 SRCD beamline was moved to, and installed on, the ANKA Synchrotron Radiation Facility, (now called KARA), part of Karlsruhe Institute of Technology (KIT), in Karlsruhe, Germany. This beamline opened for users in 2011 but was closed in 2021. Currently under construction (as of June 2023) on the Sirius synchrotron light source in Campinas, Brazil, is a new SRCD beamline, CEDRO.

== Examples of applications ==
Highlighting a few of the published works that have employed SRCD in their research studies best illustrates the power of this technique.

=== Improved conformational analysis due to increased signal-to-noise ratio ===
Cataracts are the primary cause of blindness in humans and mutations in one particular protein, γD-crystallin, have been linked to a number of congenital forms of this disease. An amino acid mutation, proline (P) to threonine (T) at position 23 of the polypeptide chain has been linked to at least four different forms of this ailment. SRCD investigations were conducted on the wild-type protein and two variants, the P23T mutant found in the disease, and a related modification, P23S (proline to serine, a chemically similar amino acid to threonine), to establish the nature of the cause of cataract formation. Two possible reasons were suggested as the causative factor; the reduced solubility of the mutant protein, or an instability in the structure of the protein being introduced by the mutation. Significantly, because the mutant had limited solubility, lab-based CD machines were only able to provide very noisy spectra and the data were uninterpretable as a result. However, the SRCD spectra produced had very low noise associated with their data, including the mutant, and showed clearly that the structures of the wild-type, the mutant, and the related protein all had very similar conformations. These data also established that the mutant retained stability to thermal denaturation, very similar to that of the wild-type protein. The data confirmed that the causative factor for the cataracts was the reduction in solubility associated with the P23T mutation and not changes in the stability of the protein.

Because of a high degree of flexibility, it had proven difficult to determine the structure of the extramembranous C-terminal domain of bacterial voltage-gated sodium channels. Using a series of synthesised channels where this C-terminal domain had been truncated, in some cases by a single amino acid difference between the constructs, the Wallace lab used SRCD to successfully identify the structure of this region.

=== Intrinsically disordered proteins (IDPs) and intrinsically disordered regions (IDRs) ===
Intrinsically disordered proteins (IDPs) have very limited innate structure in solution but gain shape specifically when interacting with partner molecules such as proteins or RNA; however, their resultant structure is often dictated by this interaction. In addition, some proteins have sections of sequence without structure, termed intrinsically disordered regions (IDRs), that also gain structure on interaction. Having different shapes with different partners means they are functionally, as well as structurally flexible, making them centrally important to signalling pathways and as regulation/control factors for example. IDPs (and IDRs if capable of being isolated from the rest of the protein) have a distinct SRCD spectral appearance in solution which means that changes in their spectra that arise through interactions offer an ideal opportunity to gain insight into what is happening both structurally and functionally. In addition, SRCD studies have demonstrated that when the solvating water is removed from these proteins, generating a film, there is a gain in structure and more CD transition bands can be measured into the lower VUV wavelength region because the water absorption band is not present

Myelin is the insulating sheath that is formed in the central (CNS) and peripheral nervous systems (PNS) to surround nerve cell axons thereby increasing and maintaining the electrical impulse, the action potential, sent along them. Formed mostly of lipids, there are specific proteins within the myelin components whose roles are to structure the myelin into linked layers. Two of these proteins are myelin basic protein (MBP), an IDP primarily in the CNS, and myelin protein zero (P0) which contains an IDR section (P0ct) and is key within the PNS. MBP and P0ct were employed in a study which used SRCD data as a key factor to establish if there was any significance to the predictions of their IDP and IDR protein structures generated by Alphafold2, an artificial intelligence program developed by DeepMind. PDB2CD, a package that generates SRCD spectra from protein atomic coordinates, was used to calculate spectra from the Alphafold2 structures, and these spectra were then compared against SRCD experimental spectra collected from the MBP and P0ct proteins in various ambient conditions; solution, detergent and lipid-bound states. The study reported that from the SRCD comparisons, the structures predicted by Alphafold2 for MBP and P0ct bore a strong resemblance to those when they were bound to the lipid membrane.

=== Sugar modification of protein SRCD signals ===
One major feature found in protein structures is the addition of sugars (glycosylation) to specific amino acid residues by post translational modification. Complex sugar structures can be connected to these sites, and this can substantially modify the properties of these proteins, a main reason for their presence. Attached sugars can assist in folding some proteins to their correct shape; so, affecting a proteins' structure is a possible outcome. SRCD is ideally well suited to determining any conformational differences that might arise from different ambient environments directly because of the extended wavelength range into the VUV region which provides greater information content. However, attached sugars can contribute to the SRCD signal because their transitions are located more towards the VUV end of the spectrum. This means that their presence can cause a problem in obtaining an accurate measure of the secondary structure content of the protein as a result. Matsuo. and Gekko produced the landmark study of VUVCD spectra of selected saccharides, thereby demonstrating that glycoproteins would have a contribution to their spectra from their sugar content. From this and further studies they demonstrated that the SRCD spectral characteristics that arose from sugars could be attributed to many factors within their conformations: the configuration of the hydroxyl group about the C1 atom of the saccharide (alpha or beta conformation, or almost axial or equatorial to the plane of the sugar ring respectively), the axial or equatorial positioning of the remaining hydroxyl groups, the trans or gauche nature of the C5 hydroxymethyl group, and the glycosidic linkage (either 1-4 or 1-6) between sugar monomers. Utilising this information, the Wallace group investigated the glycosylation of the voltage-gated sodium channel in experiments that relied on the fact that a CD(SRCD) spectrum of a mixture of components is the sum of all those components present. The aim was to establish if there were differences in the three-dimensional structure of the channel with and without sugars attached to the structure; did glycosylation play any significant role in the function of these channels when sugars were attached? Three experimental sets of SRCD spectra were collected; the non-glycosylated and glycosylated channel structures and a further one of the isolated sugar components that combined to form those attached to the channel. Taking away the spectrum of the non-glycosylated channel from that of the glycosylated they demonstrated that the resultant difference spectrum corresponded to that of the sugar components. This meant that there were no structural differences between the glycosylated and non-glycosylated channel structures, so sugar attachment played no key role in their function

=== Conformational changes of globular proteins at the oil-water interface ===
First studied in 2010 via this method, a recent investigation used SRCD to examine the differences in structure in solution and when at the oil-water interface, of peptides derived from seaweed, bacteria and potatoes as potential emulsifying agents. Of these studied, the peptide from bacteria proved to be the most effective at being both an emulsifying agent and stabilising antioxidant compound.

== Existing beamlines ==
A number of SRCD beamlines exist, or are being constructed (as of 2023), around the world as listed in the table.

SRCD Beamlines (as of June 2023)
Facility Name^{(Funders)}	Location	Country	Ring Energy	Beamline Name
ASTRID2	Aarhus University	Denmark	580 MeV	AU-UV
ASTRID2	Aarhus University	Denmark	580 MeV	AU-CD
SOLEIL	Near Paris	France	2.75 GeV	DISCO^{[a]}
HiSOR	Hiroshima University	Japan	150 MeV	BL-12
Beijing Synchrotron Radiation Facility^{[b]}	Beijing	China	2.5 GeV	4B8
DIAMOND	Near Oxford	UK	3 GeV	B23^{[c]}
Sirius	Campinas	Brazil	3 GeV	CEDRO^{[d]}

^{a} As of 2022 components from former SRCD beamline CD12 (on KARA) are now installed on the DISCO beamline

^{b} This facility also runs as part of the Beijing Electron Positron Collider (BEPC)

^{c} Two modules (A and B) exist on this beamline

^{d} This beamline is under construction and received its "first light" as of June 2023
