= Diffraction-limited storage ring =

Synchrotron light sources

Diffraction-limited storage rings (DLSR), or ultra-low emittance storage rings, are synchrotron light sources where the emittance of the electron-beam in the storage ring is smaller or comparable to the emittance of the x-ray photon beam they produce at the end of their insertion devices. These facilities operate in the soft to hard x-ray range (100eV—100keV) with extremely high brilliance (in the order of 10^{21}—10^{22} photons/s/mm^{2}/mrad^{2}/0.1%BW)

Together with X-ray free-electron lasers, they constitute the fourth generation of light sources, characterized by a relatively high coherent flux (in the order of 10^{14}—10^{15}photons/s/0.1%BW for DLSR) and enable extended physical and chemical characterizations at the nano-scale.

== Existing diffraction-limited storage rings ==
- MAX IV Laboratory, in Lund, Sweden.
- Sirius, in Campinas, Brazil
- European Synchrotron Radiation Facility, Extremely Brilliant Source (ESRF-EBS), in Grenoble, France

== DLSR upgrade or facilities under construction ==
- Advanced Photon Source Upgrade (APS-U), in Argonne, Illinois, USA
- Swiss Light Source 2, Upgrade (SLS 2.0), in Villigen, Switzerland

== Planned or projected DLSR upgrades or new facilities ==
=== Upgrades ===
- PETRA IV, Upgrade (PETRA IV), at DESY, Hamburg, Germany
- Advanced Light Source, Upgrade (ALS-U), in Berkeley, California, USA
- Diamond II (Diamond II), in Didcot, Oxfordshire, UK
- ELETTRA 2.0 (Elettra 2.0), in Trieste, Italy
- ALBA II, in Barcelona, Spain
- SOLEIL II, in Saint-Aubin, France

=== New facilities ===
- High Energy Photon Source (HEPS), in Beijing, China
- BESSY III, in Berlin, Germany

== See also ==
- X-Ray Free Electron Lasers
