= Judith Juanhuix =

Catalan researcher, physicist and transgender activist (born 1971)

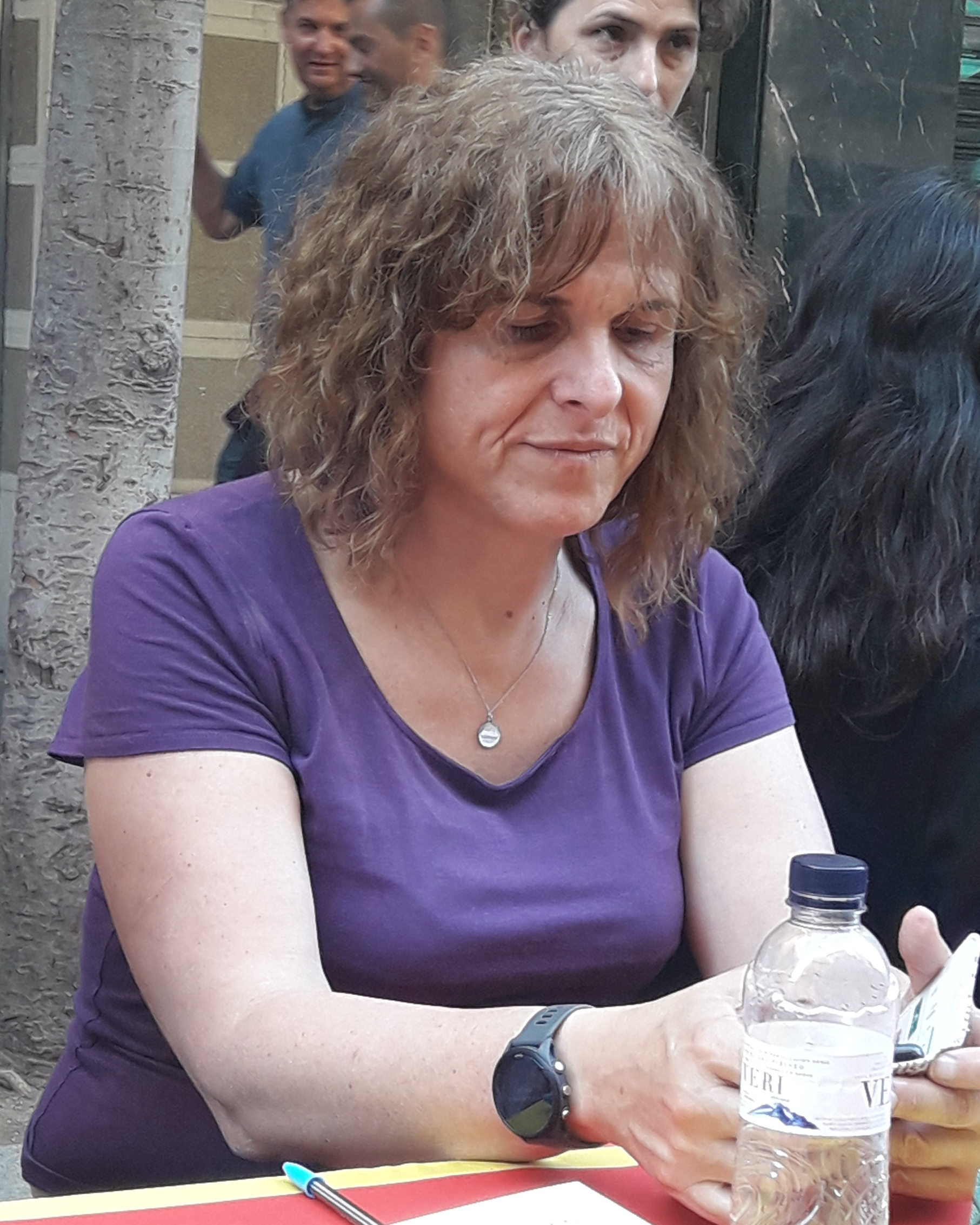
- Judith Juanhuix in 2023
- Born: 1971 (age 54–55); Girona, Spain
- Citizenship: Spanish
- Occupations: Researcher, physicist, and transgender activist

Judith Juanhuix Gibert (born 1971) is a Catalan researcher, physicist, and transgender activist.

== Early life and education ==
Juanhuix was born in 1971 in Girona, Spain. She received her PhD in biophysics in 2000 at the Autonomous University of Barcelona.

== Academic career ==
Juanhuix worked at the European Synchrotron Radiation Facility (ESRF) in Grenoble, France from 2001-2004. Since 2004 she has worked at the ALBA synchrotron, where she heads the Life Sciences and Condensed Matter section. She has published numerous articles on molecular and structural biology, supramolecular chemistry, and scientific instrumentation for X-rays.

== Activism ==
=== Transgender rights advocacy ===
Juanhuix is a member of the transgender association Generem!, of which she has served as president, and the cross-dressing association EnFemme.

Juanhuix has been actively involved in the Trans*forma la Salut platform, which has negotiated the new healthcare model for transgender individuals with the Department of Health.

=== Legislative initiatives ===
She has also been involved in various legislative initiatives for the recognition of transgender rights, such as including transgender women in the law on women's rights to eradicate gender-based violence.

== Publications ==
In 2021, she published the book Una dona (A Woman), in which she explains her life as a woman and addresses topics such as gender identity, sexuality, and relationships with family, motherhood, and health.

=== Bibliography ===
- Una dona. Ara Llibres, 2021, p. 256.

== Awards and recognition ==
- 2021: The LGBTI organizations of Girona awarded her the Girona Proud Prize in recognition of her contributions to the LGBTI movement.
- 2022: The City Council of Sant Quirze del Vallès, as part of International Women's Day, granted her the Woman Award to recognize and highlight women's work in improving their situation.

== Personal life ==
Juanhuix is the mother of two children and came out as a transgender woman at the age of forty.
