= High Energy Photon Source =

General properties
- Accelerator type: Synchrotron light source
- Beam type: electron
- Target type: light source

Beam properties
- Maximum energy: 6 GeV
- Maximum brightness: 1×10^{22} ph./s/0.1%/mm^{2}/mrad^{2}

Physical properties
- Circumference: 1360.4 m
- Location: Beijing, China
- Coordinates: 40°22′58″N 116°41′41″E
- Institution: Institute of High Energy Physics
- Dates of operation: 2026 - present

The High Energy Photon Source (HEPS) (Chinese: 高能同步辐射光源) is a diffraction-limited storage ring synchrotron light source producing hard x-ray radiations for scientific applications that will be built in the Huairou District in suburban Beijing, with estimated completion in 2025. With electron energy of 6 GeV, the facility is the first high-energy synchrotron light source in China.

== See also ==
- Beijing Synchrotron Radiation Facility
- Shanghai Synchrotron Radiation Facility
- National Synchrotron Radiation Laboratory
- Dalian Coherent Light Source
- Soft X-ray Free Electron Laser
- List of synchrotron radiation facilities
