= SAGA Light Source =

General properties
- Accelerator type: Synchrotron light source
- Beam type: electrons
- Target type: Light source

Beam properties
- Maximum energy: 1.4 GeV

Physical properties
- Circumference: 75.6 metres (248 ft)
- Location: Tosu, Saga, Japan
- Coordinates: 33.40305°N 130.51149°E
- Dates of operation: 2004–present

SAGA Light Source (SAGA-LS) is a synchrotron radiation facility at the Kyushu Synchrotron Light Research Center (佐賀県立九州シンクロトロン光研究センター, Saga kenritsu Kyūshū shinkurotoron-kō kenkyū sentā) located in the Tosu, Saga prefecture, Japan. It is operated by the local government.

== History ==
The design of the facility was finalized in March 2001 and construction started in fall 2001. Synchrotron commissioning started in 2004 and the facility was opened up to external users in 2006.

== Design and Research ==
SAGA-LS is a third-generation synchrotron source. It has a medium-sized ring with a circumference of 75.6 m. The storage energy is 1.4 GeV and beam current 300 mA. As of 2025, there are eleven beam lines in operation, including two udulators and two superconducting wigglers.

Following almost 20 years of service, large scale maintenance of the machine equipment is carried out 2023 to 2027.

== See also ==
- List of synchrotron radiation facilities
- Saga University
