= Bonnie Ann Wallace =

British/American scientist

Bonnie Ann Wallace FRSC
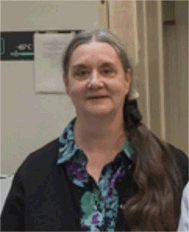
- Born: 10 August 1951 (age 75); Greenwich, Connecticut, USA
- Education: Greenwich High School, USA
- Alma mater: Rensselaer Polytechnic Institute, N.Y., USA (BS); Yale University, Conn., USA (PhD)
- Awards: 2009 Interdisciplinary Award (RSC); 2010 AstraZeneca Award (Biochem. Soc.); 2020 Khorana Prize (RSC)
- Scientific career
- Fields: membrane proteins; circular dichroism spectroscopy; synchrotron radiation circular dichroism (SRCD) spectroscopy; Bioinformatics
- Workplaces: Columbia University, N.Y., USA; Rensselaer Polytechnic Institute, N.Y., USA; Birkbeck College, University of London
- Thesis: The influence of the lipid state on the planar distribution of membrane proteins in Acholeplasma laidlawii (1977)
- Website: people.cryst.bbk.ac.uk/~ubcg25a/

Bonnie Ann Wallace, FRSC (born 10 August 1951) is a British and American biophysicist and biochemist. She is a professor of molecular biophysics in the department of biological sciences, formerly the department of crystallography, at Birkbeck College, University of London, U.K.

== Early life and education ==
Wallace was born in Greenwich, Connecticut in the United States, the only child of Arthur Victor Wallace and Maryjane Ann Wallace, who were both accountants. She attended Greenwich High School and had a strong interest in science from an early age. She commented on having a Christmas present of a chemistry set which was "quickly disposed of" when she experimented with burning sulphur in the basement of her home. At Greenwich High, she was encouraged to do more when, as top of her chemistry class, she was invited to join an extracurricular science programme. To answer the questions posed to the group, she would make suggestions in devising novel experiments beyond those proposed by the teacher. The teacher bought in equipment to enable Wallace and the group to carry out her ideas.

Wallace chose to undertake a chemistry degree, gaining a place at Rensselaer Polytechnic Institute, New York. She then went to do her PhD at Yale University, Connecticut, under the supervision of professors Donald Engelman and Frederic M. Richards in the department of molecular biophysics and biochemistry. After obtaining her doctorate, Wallace was awarded a postdoctoral Jane Coffin Childs fellowship which she undertook at Harvard University under professor Elkan Blout for her first year, before moving to the lab of Dr Richard Henderson at the Medical Research Council Laboratory of Molecular Biology in Cambridge, learning the technique of electron crystallography for membrane proteins.

== Career and research ==
After her postdoctoral training Wallace took up an assistant professorship at Columbia University, N.Y. Medical School in the department of biochemistry and molecular biophysics, now part of the Vagelos College of Physicians and Surgeons. Whilst at Columbia she won the Margaret Oakley Dayhoff Award of the Biophysical Society (1984/85) and the following year was promoted to Associate Professor. She moved from Columbia to Rensselaer Polytechnic as full Professor of Chemistry to head the new, at that time, Center for Biophysics. In 1990, Wallace was awarded a Fogarty Senior Fellowship enabling her to take a sabbatical to visit and work in the department of crystallography at Birkbeck College, University of London, U.K.. This was to extend her knowledge of crystallography to add to the techniques she was utilizing for the study of membrane proteins. Shortly after her return to the USA she was offered a position in the Department and moved her lab to the UK in 1991. Between 1999 and 2006 while still at Birkbeck, she was also Director of the Centre for Protein and Membrane Structure and Dynamics (CPMSD) at Daresbury Laboratory. Since 2009 she has been co-director of the Protein Circular Dichroism Data Bank.

Wallace has two main branches of research, the first of these being on the development of techniques, applications and methods for circular dichroism spectroscopy and particularly synchrotron radiation circular dichroism (SRCD) spectroscopy. Her position as the major figure behind the advancement of SRCD, through performing "proof of principle" experiments and novel cutting edge studies on membrane proteins lead to her receiving the 2009 Interdisciplinary Prize from the Royal Society of Chemistry and the 2010 AstraZeneca Award from the Biochemical Society (UK).

Wallace's other main research field is the study of membrane proteins, focusing on ion channel structures, specifically voltage-gated sodium channels. Her lab solved the first crystal structure of a sodium channel in the open conformation, and the first such structures with pharmaceutical drugs bound into them providing key information of how drugs interact with such proteins and the specific amino acids in these proteins that are responsible for disease states, amongst many other significant papers revealing the structures, functions and dynamics of channel-drug interactions. For her "pioneering work" developing biophysical methods and bioinformatics tools to enable research on ion channel/drug interactions, Wallace was awarded the 2020 Khorana Prize from the Royal Society of Chemistry.

=== Structural studies on the binding of motor neurone disease (MND)/amyotrophic lateral sclerosis (ALS) drug Riluzole to the voltage-gated sodium channel ===
A study published in 2024 from the Wallace group in collaboration with others reported on the binding of Riluzole to the voltage-gated sodium channel. Riluzole is the only drug currently licensed in the European Union for the treatment of motor neurone disease (MND), also known as amyotrophic lateral sclerosis (ALS). Its primary activity is to block the uncontrollable leakage of sodium ions through these voltage-gated sodium channels which results in the damaging of neurons, one of the causative factors of MND. The study identified that the drug enters into these channels from within the cell membrane through holes in the channel sides, termed fenestrations. It binds into a novel site, distinct and away from the positions of other drugs that are known to interact with, and affect, these channels. This unique property is an important factor in the possible future development of further drug agents to treat MND.

== Honours and awards ==
In 1977 Wallace received a Jane Coffin Childs fellowship to pursue her postdoctoral research.

In 1979 she was awarded an Irma T. Hirschl and Monique Weill-Caulier Research Award to enable her research programme at Columbia.

In 1984/85 Wallace became an inaugural recipient of the Margaret Oakley Dayhoff Award from the Biophysical Society given to a woman who "holds very high promise or has achieved prominence while developing the early stages of a career in biophysical research"; this is considered "one of the top national honors" in biophysics.

In 1985 Wallace received a Camille Dreyfus teacher-scholar award "to support the research and teaching careers of talented young faculty in the chemical sciences."

In 1990 she was named one of the twelve "Hot Young Scientists" by Fortune Magazine.

In 1995 she was elected a Fellow of the Institute of Biology (FIBiol)

In 1998 she was elected a Fellow of the Royal Society of Chemistry

In 1999 Wallace was elected a Fellow of the American Association for the Advancement of Science (AAAS)

In 2004 she was a distinguished visiting professor at Tzu Chi University and Academia Sinica, Taiwan.

In 2009 she was awarded a special fellowship for the Promotion of Science from the Japan Society, U.K.

In 2009 Wallace was awarded the Interdisciplinary Prize from the Royal Society of Chemistry

"Awarded for her work in developing applications of synchrotron radiation circular dichroism spectroscopy as a tool in chemistry, structural genomics, biochemistry and chemical biology."

In 2010 she was elected a Fellow of the International Union of Pure and Applied Chemistry.

In 2010 Wallace was awarded the AstraZeneca Award from the Biochemical Society (UK)

“In recognition of outstanding work leading to the development of a new method in science”, that of SRCD.

In 2016 she was elected an Honorary Member of the British Biophysical Society.

In 2016 Wallace was elected a Fellow of the (U.S.) Biophysical Society.

In 2017 a Special Issue:Shining Light on Membrane Proteins of the European Biophysics Journal was published in her name honouring her 65th birthday.

In 2020 Wallace won the Khorana Prize from the Royal Society of Chemistry. The citation reads:

"For the pioneering development of biophysical methods and bioinformatics tools to enable the characterisation of ion channel-drug molecule complexes."
