= Cerdanyola del Vallès =

- Municipality
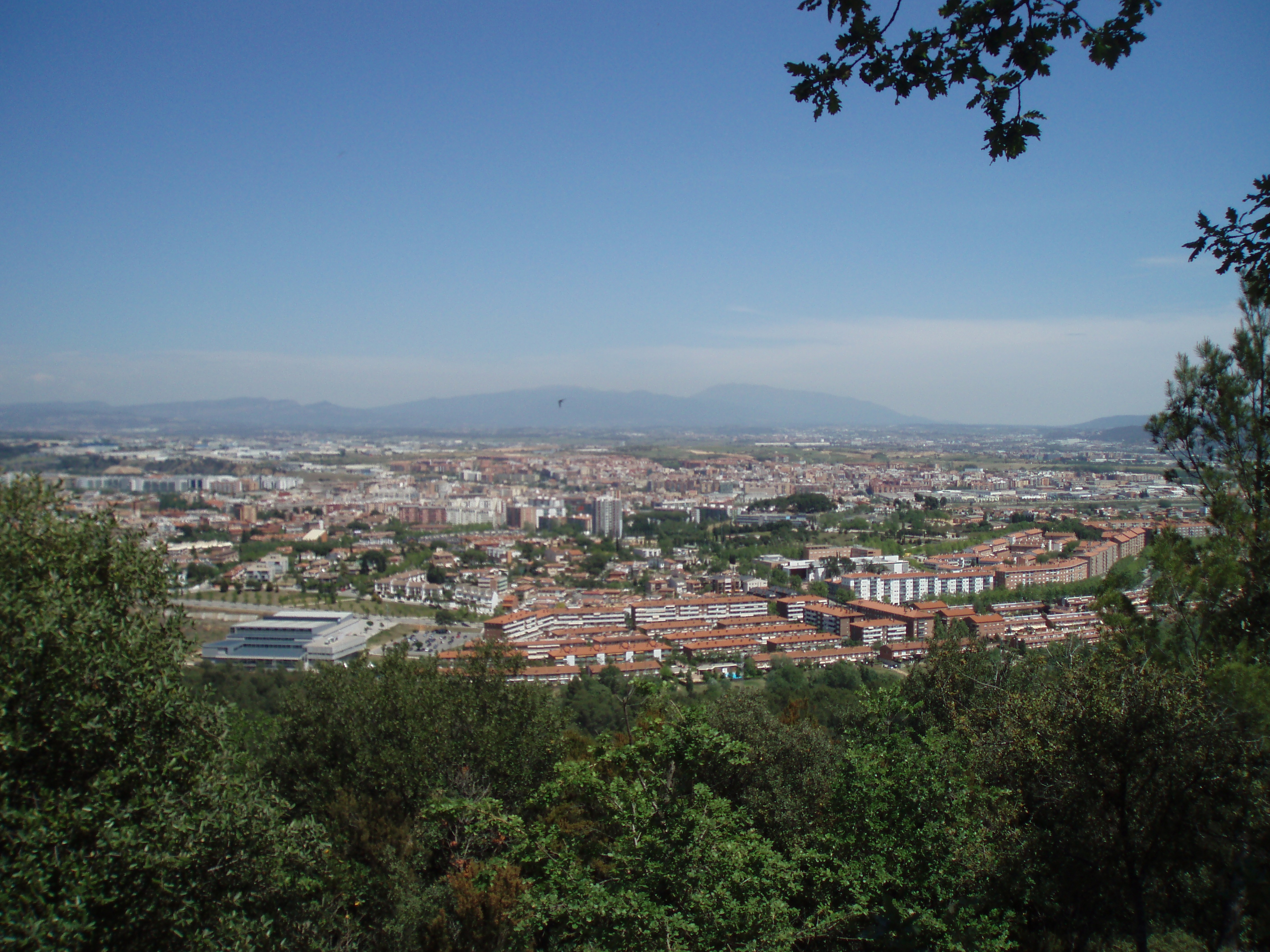

- Flag Coat of arms

- Location in Catalonia Cerdanyola del Vallès (Spain)
- Coordinates: 41°29′31″N 2°08′20″E
- Country: Spain
- Autonomous community: Catalonia
- Province: Barcelona
- Comarca: Vallès Occidental

Government
  - Mayor: Carlos Cordón Núñez (2019) (Socialists' Party of Catalonia)

Area
  - Total: 30.6 km^{2} (11.8 sq mi)
- Elevation: 32 m (105 ft)

Population (2025-01-01)
  - Total: 58,528
  - Density: 1,910/km^{2} (4,950/sq mi)
- Demonym(s): Cerdanyolenc, cerdanyolenca
- Postal code: 08290
- Website: www.cerdanyola.cat

Cerdanyola del Vallès (Catalan pronunciation: [səɾðəˈɲɔlə ðəl βəˈʎɛs]) is a municipality in the comarca of the Vallès Occidental in Catalonia, Spain. It is situated on the north side of the Collserola ridge. The town is served by the A-7 and C-58 motorways, the N-150 road and the Renfe railway commuter lines R4 and R7. It is well known as the site of the main campus of the Universitat Autònoma de Barcelona (at Bellaterra) and hosts the ALBA (synchrotron) located in the Barcelona Synchrotron Park.

== Main sights ==
As befits a municipality which has increased its population more than fiftyfold in the last century, most of the buildings are modern. The parish church is in a modernist style, while the Sant Marçal castle has been rebuilt in a neogothic style. The botanical gardens of El Pedregar (also at Bellaterra) have a notable collection of sculptures. Iberian remains have been found and are exposed at Ca n'Oliver Iberian Settlement and Museum.

== Notable people ==
- Ramon Sauló (born 1954), singer and graphic designer.
- Yolanda Ramos (born 1968), actress and comedian.
- Abril Zamora (born 1981), actress, screenwriter, and director.
