= Kurchatov Center for Synchrotron Radiation and Nanotechnology =

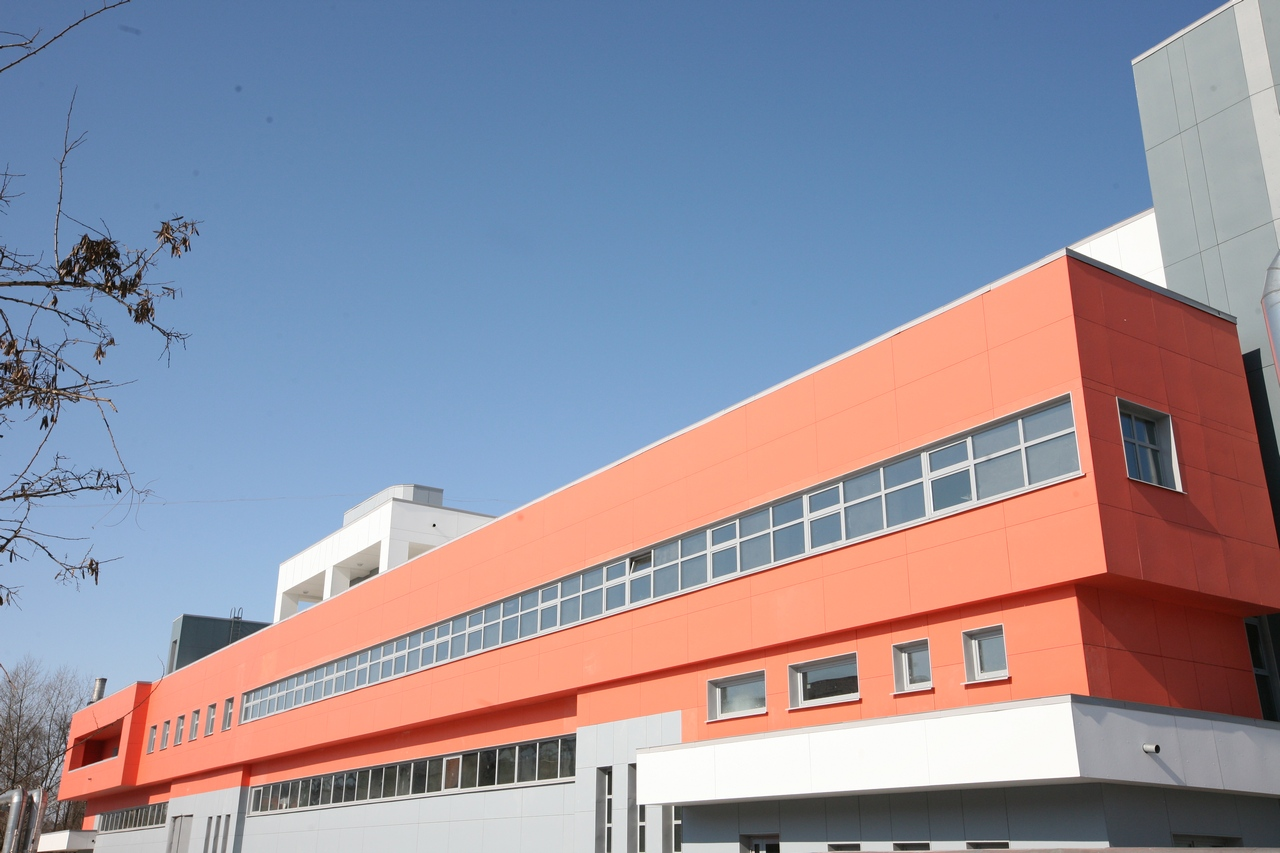
Kurchatov synchrotron radiation source.

The Kurchatov Center for Synchrotron Radiation and Nanotechnology (KCSRN) is a Russian interdisciplinary institute for synchrotron-based research. The source is used for research in fields such as biology, chemistry, physics and palaeontology.

As with all synchrotron sources, the Kurchatov source is a user facility.

== History ==
Construction began in 1986. The intended completion date in 1989 was pushed back due to economic difficulties causing delays. The building was finally completed in December, 1999.

== Electron accelerator ==
The electron accelerator for the Kurchatov synchrotron was built by Budker Institute of Nuclear Physics, a world leader in accelerator physics. The magnetic structure is very similar to that of the ANKA synchrotron in Karlsruhe. The accelerator includes an injection system, the Sibir-1 booster and the Sibir-2 storage ring. Injection is done at 450 MeV, but an upgrade program was expected to raise the energy level.

Radiation is generated by bending magnets at 1.7 T. Critical energy is 7.1 keV and superconducting high-field wiggler offers 7.5 T, with 19 poles.

Accelerator parameters	Sibir-2	Sibir-1
Energy, GeV	2.5	0.45
Current, mA	100	150
Circud	14 beamlines, mostly for soft and hard x-rays
