= National Synchrotron Radiation Research Center =

Taiwanese synchrotron radiation facility

Coordinates: 24.781091°N 120.993378°E

- 國家同步輻射研究中心
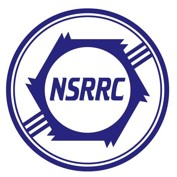

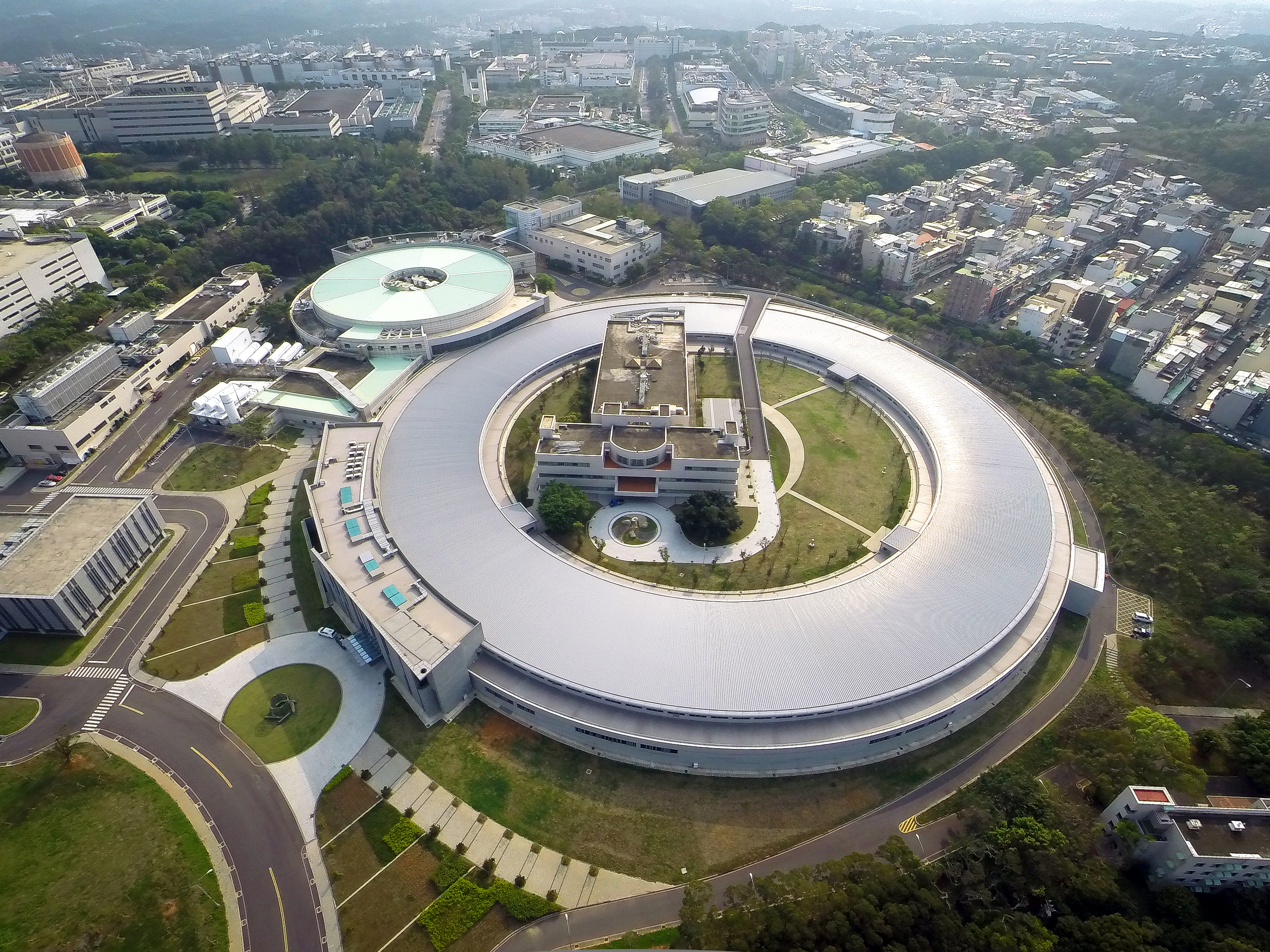

Agency overview
- Formed: October 1993
- Headquarters: East, Hsinchu City, Taiwan
- Parent agency: National Science and Technology Council
- Website: www.nsrrc.og.tw

The National Synchrotron Radiation Research Center (NSRRC; Chinese: 國家同步輻射研究中心; pinyin: Guójiā Tóngbù Fúshè Yánjiū Zhōngxīn) synchrotron radiation facility at the Hsinchu Science Park in East District, Hsinchu City, Taiwan as the agency under the Ministry of Science and Technology of the Republic of China.

It houses the Taiwan Light Source (TLS) and Taiwan Photon Source (TPS). Additionally, the NSRRC also operates two beamlines at SPring-8 in Japan and the Sika neutron scattering instrument at the OPAL research reactor in Australia.

== Instruments ==
=== Taiwan Light Source ===
The TLS is Taiwan's first synchrotron and was opened in 1993 as a third-generation synchrotron with a beam energy of 1.5 GeV beam. The storage ring has a circumference of 120 m. There are twenty-six operational beamlines. They cover a wide range of functionality, from IR microscopy to X-ray lithography.

=== Taiwan Photon Source ===
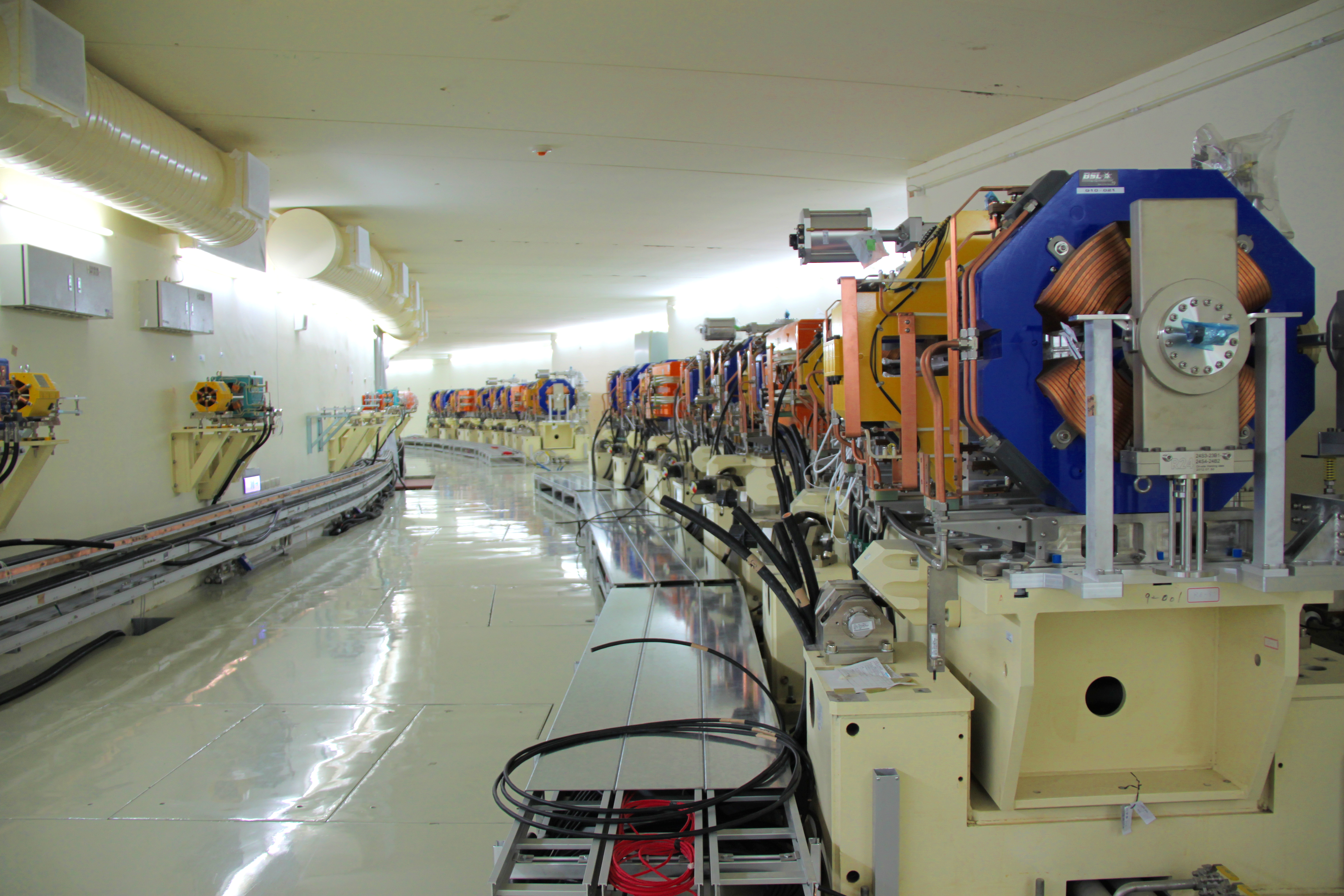
TPS Tunnel

The TPS is a 3-GeV third-generation synchrotron light source, built at a cost of approximately NT$7 billion (US$224 million). After a seven-year plan was launched in 2007, it delivered first light on December 31, 2014. Projected to be 10,000 times brighter than the TLS, the TPS is considered one of the world's brightest light sources. It has a storage ring circumference of 518.4 m. The facility is expected to have 48 experimental stations fully operational by 2016. The synchrotron is aimed to benefit biomedical and nanotechnology research. The TPS is located adjacent to the TLS and the two light sources are intended to be complementary in providing a wide range of the photon spectrum, from IR to x-rays greater than 10 keV, for researchers' needs.

== Organizational structure ==
- Light Source Division
- Instrumentation Development Division
- Experimental Facility Division
- Scientific Research Division
- Administration Division
- Radiation and Operation Safety Division
