= MAX IV Laboratory =

Synchrotron radiation facility at Lund University in Sweden

MAX IV
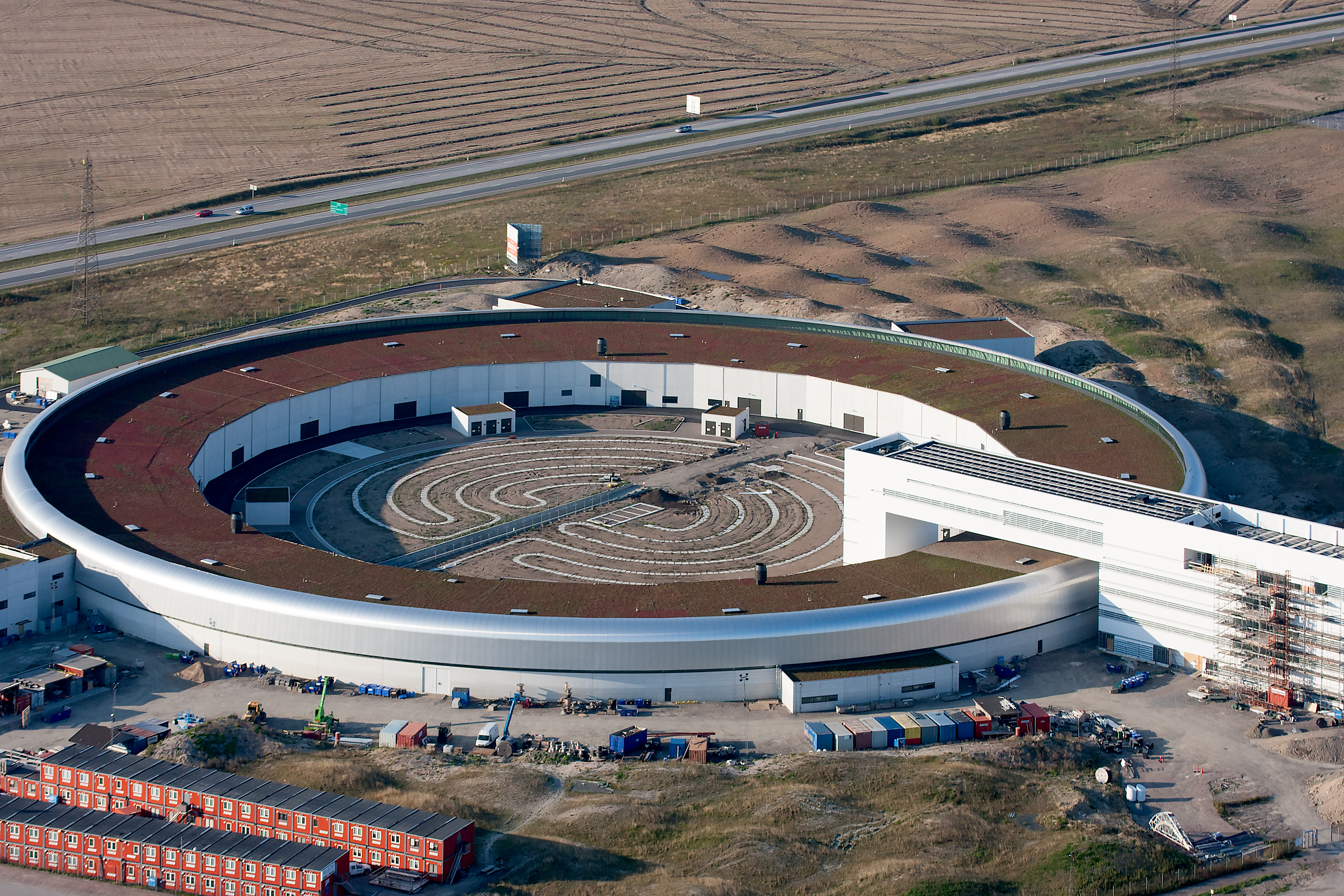
- MAX IV aerial photo, September 2014

General properties
- Accelerator type: Synchrotron light source
- Beam type: Electrons
- Target type: Light source

Beam properties
- Maximum energy: Large ring R3: 3.0 GeV, Small ring R1: 1.5 GeV
- Maximum current: Large ring R3: 0.5 A, normal current 0.4 A, Small ring R1: 0.5 A

Physical properties
- Length: Linac: ~300 metres (1,000 ft)
- Radius: Linac: 40 millimetres (1.6 in), Storage rings: 15 millimetres (0.59 in)
- Circumference: Large ring R3: 528 metres (1,732 ft), Small ring R1: 96 metres (315 ft)
- Location: Brunnshög, Lund, Sweden
- Coordinates: 55.727°N 13.233°E
- Institution: Lund University
- Dates of operation: 2016–present
- Preceded by: MAX I, II, and III

MAX IV is a synchrotron light source facility in Lund, Sweden, in the northeastern quarter Brunnshög as part of an innovation district including ESS and Science Village. MAX IV uses synchrotron light to examine materials at the micrometre and nanometre length scale, and in the nanosecond and picosecond time scale to understand their chemical and physical properties. The material research conducted at MAX IV has broad applications in medical, technical, biological, agricultural, industrial, and cultural fields. It became operational in 2016 and is the world's first fourth-generation synchrotron light source. MAX IV has one linear accelerator, linac, with one beamline, and two storage rings with 5 and 11 beamlines, respectively. The radiation hits the samples in experiment stations at the end of each beamline and is examined by diffraction, spectroscopy, or imaging techniques to determine physical structure, chemical composition, dynamics, and other properties of the samples.

The research done at MAX IV helps researchers and companies to develop new drugs and materials, and many patents can be traced back to the research and findings at MAX IV. The number of employees at MAX IV is about 300 full-time equivalents. The number of guest researchers and their published articles per year has increased steadily since opening and is currently about 2000 guest researchers and 300 published articles per year with an average impact factor of about 7.5. If the guest researchers publish, they do not have to pay for having used beamtime at MAX IV. That is to increase the number of guest researcher applicants. Applications are submitted twice a year via the MAX IV webpage.

== Purpose ==
The purpose of MAX IV is to obtain information about materials and objects in society and nature. This helps to understand the world better and how to benefit from it. Examples of applications include developing new materials, cosmetics, electronics, medicines, and food. Materials and objects that can be examined include everything that a ~1-millimetre sized sample can be made of. It is done by using synchrotron radiation, SR, to look at the samples in the micrometre and nanometre length scale, and in the nanosecond and picosecond time scale, like a microscope or “nanoscope” in a very short time scale. In that way, molecular and atomic structure, and thus most things there are to know, about the samples can be revealed. The samples can be physical, chemical, biological, technical, medical, and of other types.

For length scale, the small ring R1 is in micrometres by using UV and soft X-rays, the large ring R3 is in nanometres by using, mostly, tender and hard X-rays, and both are in nanosecond time scale by having electrons in bunches with a time length of 0.1 nanoseconds. The short-pulse facility, SPF, is in the nanometre length scale by tender and hard X-rays, and picosecond time scale by having electrons in bunches with a time length down to about 0.1 picoseconds. UV and soft X-rays are used to examine microparticles, cells, and other structures at the micrometre length scale. Due to the low penetration depth of UV and soft X-rays, they are also used to examine surface structures of the samples. Tender and hard X-rays are used to examine nanoparticles, molecules, individual atoms, and other structures at the nanometre length scale. Due to the high penetration depth of tender and hard X-rays, they are used to examine the interior structure of the samples. On the nanosecond time scale, the movement of the structures in or on the sample due to temperature and pressure can be observed. On the picosecond time scale, molecular vibrations and chemical reactions in the sample can be observed.

== History ==
The accelerator history of Lund started in the 1950s and includes MAX I, II, III, and IV, among other accelerators. The first synchrotron at Lund University, now called Ur-MAX, was constructed at KTH with an electron energy of 35 megaelectronvolts, MeV, and installed in 1953. It was used until 1962 when it was succeeded by Lund University Synchrotron, LUSY, with electron energy 1.2 GeV. It was used in the 1960s, upgraded in 1971, and continued operation until 1977. The main purpose of Ur-MAX and LUSY was nuclear and particle physics research with SR as a by-product. That type of synchrotron is called the first-generation SR source. In parallel to the use of LUSY, the racetrack microtron was developed at KTH. Inspired by that, Lund University decided in 1974 to build one with electron energy 100 MeV, completed in 1979. It was called Microtron Accelerator for X-rays, MAX, now called Maxine. In 1981, the international research laboratory MAX-lab was created with the purpose to build a 550 MeV storage ring called MAX I with Maxine as an injector specially dedicated to do SR research. That type of synchrotron is called the second-generation SR source.

A machine hall at LTH got ready for move-in in 1983, the first electrons circulated in the ring in 1985, and the research began in 1987. The ring had 8 dipole bending magnets ordered in 4 pairs called double bend achromats, DBA. It had a circumference of 32 metres, emittance 40 nanometre radians, maximum stored current 0.2 amperes, and initially 4 beamlines, later expanded to 7. In parallel, MAX-lab started to build MAX II in 1991, completed in 1995. It was a storage ring with electron energy 1.5 GeV, 10 DBA, circumference 90 metres, emittance 9 nanometre radians, maximum stored current 0.35 amperes, and initially 7 beamlines. For 4 of the beamlines, MAX II had insertion devices called undulators or wigglers to produce the SR instead of the bending magnets, which increased the brilliance of the radiation. That type of synchrotron is called the third-generation SR source.

MAX I was upgraded with 2 additional beamlines with undulators, and MAX II was later also upgraded with 2 additional beamlines with undulators and another undulator for one of the old beamlines. In parallel, Maxine was replaced by a 9 metres long 250 MeV linac that was being used twice to give electron energy 500 MeV for injection to MAX I and II. After that, MAX-lab started to build MAX III, completed in 2007, in parallel with planning the future MAX IV. MAX III had 8 magnetic cells consisting of dipole bending magnets with integrated multipole focusing magnets as a prototype for MAX IV. That design was created by Mikael Eriksson working as senior professor in accelerator physics at Lund University and Machine Director and Design Coordinator at MAX IV. MAX III had electron energy 700 MeV, circumference 36 metres, emittance 13 nanometre radians, maximum stored current 0.4 amperes, 2 undulators, and 3 beamlines. In 1988, MAX-lab had 100 guest researchers per year. That number increased steadily to 1000 per year in 2014.

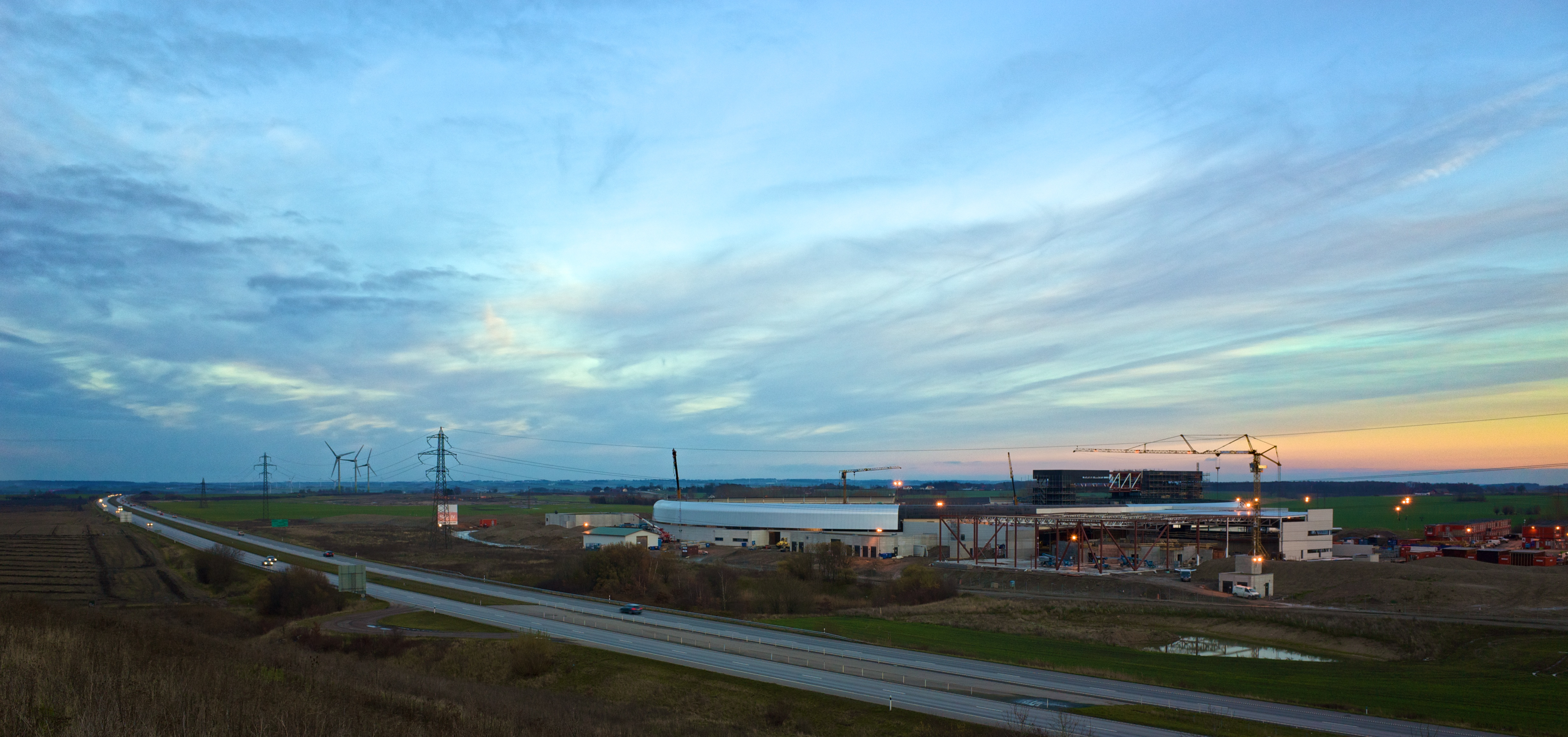
MAX IV in Lund being built, November 2013.

The Swedish Research Council took the decision that MAX IV would be built in 2009. Construction started in 2010, completed in 2016 with linac, SPF, new ring R3 and reused upgraded MAX II as ring R1. In parallel, MAX-lab was closed in 2015. MAX I, II, and III all had dipole bending magnets and quadrupole and sextupole focusing magnets. R1 has that too but integrated as in MAX III, still electron energy 1.5 GeV, and upgraded to 12 DBA, circumference 96 metres, emittance 6 nanometre radians, and maximum stored current 0.5 amperes. It currently has 5 beamlines with 5 undulators and potential to build 5 more of each. R3 has those magnets too, integrated as in MAX III, but also octupole focusing magnets. Instead of pairs, the dipole bending magnets are ordered in groups of 7 called multi bend achromats, MBA.

In addition to those MBA configurations with integrated magnets including octupoles, R3 has a complete interior coating of a non-evaporable getter, NEG, to create and keep ultra-high vacuum, UHV, in the ring. The MBA and UHV increases the brilliance of the radiation further. That type of synchrotron is called the fourth-generation SR source. Upon completion of R3, it was the first and only fourth-generation SR source out of ~50 SR sources in the world. At present, the MBA and complete NEG-coating technology have been integrated into most particle accelerator facilities in the world. R3 has electron energy 3 GeV, 20 MBA, circumference 528 metres, emittance 0.2–0.33 nanometre radians, and maximum stored current 0.5 amperes. It currently has 11 beamlines, of which TomoWISE is the latest approved, with 11 undulators and potential to build 8 more of each.

== Design ==
MAX IV has two electron sources below ground level, one thermionic source with a hot cathode, and one photoelectric source with a photocathode. The thermionic source sends electrons via the 300 metres long linac into both storage rings R1 and R3 for a few seconds once every 10 minutes continuously to maintain the total amount of electrons in the storage rings at a constant level. That is called a top-up injector. The linac contains about 6000 cavities with the RF-range frequency 3 GHz. After half the linac, ~150 metres (500 ft), a diagonal transfer line sends about one quarter of the electrons with energy 1.5 GeV up to ground level for the small storage ring R1. After the whole linac, a second diagonal transfer line sends the rest of the electrons with energy 3 GeV up to ground level for the large storage ring R3. The photoelectric source sends electrons the rest of the time via the linac that are split up into bunches with a time length down to about 0.1 picoseconds and oscillated by undulators to emit high-intensity tender and hard X-ray SR. That SR is sent to a beamline at SPF and used to examine samples with molecular vibrations and chemical reactions on that time scale.

R1 has a circumference of 96 metres (315 ft). It consists of 12 3.5 metres (~11 ft) long straight sections, numbered 1–12, each followed by a 4.5 metres (15 ft) long rounded corner, called double bend achromats, DBA, meaning that they each contain 2 pairs of dipole bending magnets. The magnetic field points downwards with a strength in the order of 1 tesla, pulling the incoming electrons to the right and thus making the electrons go clockwise in the ring. The dipole bending magnets are integrated with quadrupole and sextupole focusing magnets to give the electron beam the size of a pressed human hair. In 5 of the 12 straight sections, undulators are oscillating the electron beam, causing it to emit high-intensity UV and soft X-ray SR which is sent out from the ring to beamlines where it hits samples. The use of undulators makes the ring R1 a third-generation SR source. The samples are examined by diffraction, spectroscopy, or imaging techniques.

Straight section 1 is where the electrons enter R1. It contains a septum magnet to steer the electrons from the diagonal transfer line to R1. Section 2 is empty to make the beam more focused after the septum magnet. Sections 3–6 and 9 are future sites for undulators with subsequent beamlines, of which section 4 contains 4 acceleration cavities with the RF-range frequency 100 MHz which compensate for the energy loss of the electron beam due to the DBA and undulators. That frequency puts the electrons in 3 centimetres (~1.2 in) long bunches 3 metres (~10 ft) apart. Sections 7–8 and 10–12 contain the current undulators with subsequent beamlines.

R3 has a circumference of 528 metres (1732 ft). It consists of 20 almost 5 metres (~16 ft) long straight sections, numbered 1–20, each followed by an almost 22 metres (~71 ft) long rounded corner, called multi bend achromats, MBA, meaning that they each contain 7 pairs of dipole bending magnets. As in R1, the magnetic field points downwards with a strength in the order of 1 tesla, pulling the incoming electrons to the right and thus making the electrons go clockwise in the ring. The dipole bending magnets are integrated with quadrupole, sextupole, and octupole focusing magnets to give the electron beam the size of a pressed human hair.

R3 also has a complete interior coating of a non-evaporable getter, NEG, to create and keep ultra-high vacuum, UHV, in the ring. In 11 of the 20 straight sections, undulators are oscillating the electron beam, causing it to emit high-intensity X-ray SR which is sent out from the ring to beamlines where it hits samples. For 3 of the beamlines, it is soft and tender X-rays. For the rest of the beamlines, it is tender and hard X-rays. The use of MBA and complete NEG-coating makes the ring R3 a fourth-generation SR source. Upon completion, it was the first and only fourth-generation SR source in the world. As in R1, the samples are examined by diffraction, spectroscopy, or imaging techniques.

Straight section 1 is where the electrons enter R3. It contains a septum magnet to steer the electrons from the diagonal transfer line to R3. Sections 2, 5–6, 13–15, and 19–20 are future sites for undulators with subsequent beamlines. Sections 3–4, 7–12, and 16–18 contain the current undulators with subsequent beamlines, of which sections 16–18 give soft and tender X-rays, and the rest give tender and hard X-rays. The end of the 6 MBA following sections 16–20 and 1 contain acceleration cavities, as in R1, with the RF-range frequency 100 MHz which compensate for the energy loss of the electron beam due to the MBA and undulators. That frequency puts the electrons in 3 centimetres (~1.2 in) long bunches 3 metres (~10 ft) apart.

== Beamlines ==
For reference, UV has photon energy 3.1–124 eV. Soft, tender, and hard X-rays have 0.124–1.24, 1.24–12.4, and 12.4–124 keV, respectively.

Beamline	Location	Inauguration	Radiation	Main science areas	Techniques & methods
Balder	R3:08	2019, 6th	tender, hard	Ca, C, CH, ES, Gc, L, MS	E, O, XN, XA, XE, XF
BioMAX	R3:11	2017, 1st	tender, hard	MC, SB	SS, XC, XF
Bloch	R1:10	2019, 5th	UV, soft	Q, SP	AR, ST, PS
CoSAXS	R3:10	2020, 11th	tender, hard	L, SM	SA, TR, W
DanMAX	R3:04	2022, 13th	hard	BT, BM, Ca, C, EM, MS	I, O, MC, PD, PC, PX, R, SD, T, TS, XD, XF, XT
FemtoMAX	SPF:1	2021, 12th	tender, hard		G, SA, W
FinEstBeAMS	R1:12	2019, 4th	UV, soft	AM, AC, C, MS, P, SS	AR, L, NI, PP, TR, XA, PS
FlexPES	R1:07	2020, 8th	UV, soft	AM, AC, MS, SC	AR, CS, NE, PS
ForMAX	R3:09	2022, 15th	tender, hard	SM	SA, T, W
HIPPIE	R3:17	2018, 3rd	soft, tender	2D, AC, Ca, Co, E, EC, SS	AA, AP
MAXPEEM	R1:11	2019, 7th	UV, soft	LD, MM, SS	LE, MX, MF, NA, XP
MicroMAX	R3:12	2024, 16th	tender, hard	SB	A, SS, TR, XF
NanoMAX	R3:03	2017, 2nd	tender, hard	B, FM, G, MS	CI, NT, P, SD, XF
SoftiMAX	R3:18	2022, 14th	soft, tender	C, ES, L, M, MS	F, LX, SX
SPECIES	R1:08	2020, 9th	UV, soft	AL, AC, Ca, ES, F, MS, Pc, R, SS	AA, AP, RI
Veritas	R3:16	2020, 10th	soft	C, MS, P	RI

Main science areas		Techniques & methods	
Abbreviation	Expansion	Abbreviation	Expansion
2D	2D Materials	AA	Ambient Pressure X-ray Absorption Spectroscopy (APXAS)
AL	Atomic Layer Deposition (ALD)	AP	Ambient Pressure X-ray Photoemission Spectroscopy (APXPS)
AM	Atomic, Molecular, and Optical (AMO) Low-Density Matter (LDM) Science	AR	Angle-Resolved Photoelectron Spectroscopy (ARPES)
AC	Atmospheric Chemistry	A	Automated
BT	Biological Tissue	CI	Coherent Imaging
B	Biology	CS	Coincidence Spectroscopy
BM	Biomineralized Materials	E	Extended X-ray Absorption Fine Structure (EXAFS)
Ca	Catalysis	PS	Flexible Photoelectron Spectroscopy (XPS)
C	Chemistry	F	Forward Ptychography
Co	Corrosion	I	In operation Powder X-ray Diffraction and Pair Distribution Function (In operando PXRD & PDF)
CH	Cultural Heritage	G	Laser pump/X-ray probe in Grazing Incident X-ray Scattering (GIXS)
E	Electrochemistry	LE	Low-Energy Electron Microscope (LEEM)
EM	Energy Materials	LX	Low-Energy X-ray Fluorescence (LE-XRF)
EC	Environmental Chemistry	L	Luminescence
ES	Environmental Science	MC	Micro Computed Tomography (Micro-CT)
FM	Functional Materials	MF	Micro Flexible Photoelectron Spectroscopy (Micro-XPS)
F	Fundamental Physics	MX	Micro X-ray and Absorption Spectroscopy (Micro-XAS)
Gc	Geochemistry	NA	Nano Angle-Resolved Photoelectron Spectroscopy (Nano-ARPES)
G	Geology	NT	Nano-Tomography
L	Life Science	NE	Near-Edge X-ray Absorption Fine Structure (NEXAFS)
LD	Low-Dimensional Systems	NI	Negative-Ion/Positive-Ion Coincidence (NIPICO)
MM	Magnetic Materials	O	On site X-ray Diffraction and Pair Distribution Function (In-situ XRD & PDF)
M	Magnetism	PD	Pair Distribution Function (PDF)
MS	Materials Science	PC	Phase-contrast imaging
Pc	Photocatalysis	PP	Photoelectron-Photoion Coincidence (PEPICO)
P	Physics	PX	Powder X-ray Diffraction (PXRD)
Q	Quantum Materials	P	Ptychography
R	Redox Chemistry	R	Radiography
MC	Small Molecular Crystallography	RI	Resonant Inelastic X-ray Scattering (RIXS)
SM	Soft Matter	SX	Scanning Transmission X-ray Microscopy (STXM)
SB	Structural Biology	ST	Scanning Tunneling Microscope (STM)
SP	Surface Physics	SD	Scanning X-Ray Diffraction Imaging
SC	Surface Physics and Chemistry	SS	Serial Synchrotron Crystallography (SSX)
SS	Surface Science	SA	Small Angle X-ray Scattering (SAXS)
		TR	Time-Resolved
		T	Tomography
		TS	Total Scattering
		W	Wide Angle X-ray Scattering (WAXS)
		XN	X-ray Absorption Near-Edge Structure (XANES)
		XA	X-ray and Absorption Spectroscopy (XAS)
		XE	X-ray and Emission Spectroscopy (XES)
		XC	X-ray Crystallography
		XD	X-ray Diffraction-Computed Tomography (XRD-CT)
		XF	X-ray Fluorescence (XRF)
		XP	X-ray Photoemission Electron Microscopy (XPEEM)
		XT	X-ray Tomographic Method (XTM)

== See also ==
- List of synchrotron radiation facilities
- European Spallation Source
