= Singapore Synchrotron Light Source =

Singapore Synchrotron Light Source (SSLS) is a synchrotron radiation facility located on Kent Ridge campus of the National University of Singapore.

== History ==
The SSLS building project commenced in 1997 and concluded in 1999. Following the completion, the Helios 2 storage ring was relocated into the facility, and in 2000, an accelerator system was commissioned along with the construction of a beamline. In October 2001, user pilot operation commenced, starting with a phase-contrast imaging beamline. Additional facilities were subsequently added, and routine user operation was successfully established by 2003.
