= Barcelona Synchrotron Park =

Coordinates: 41°29′17″N 2°6′27″E

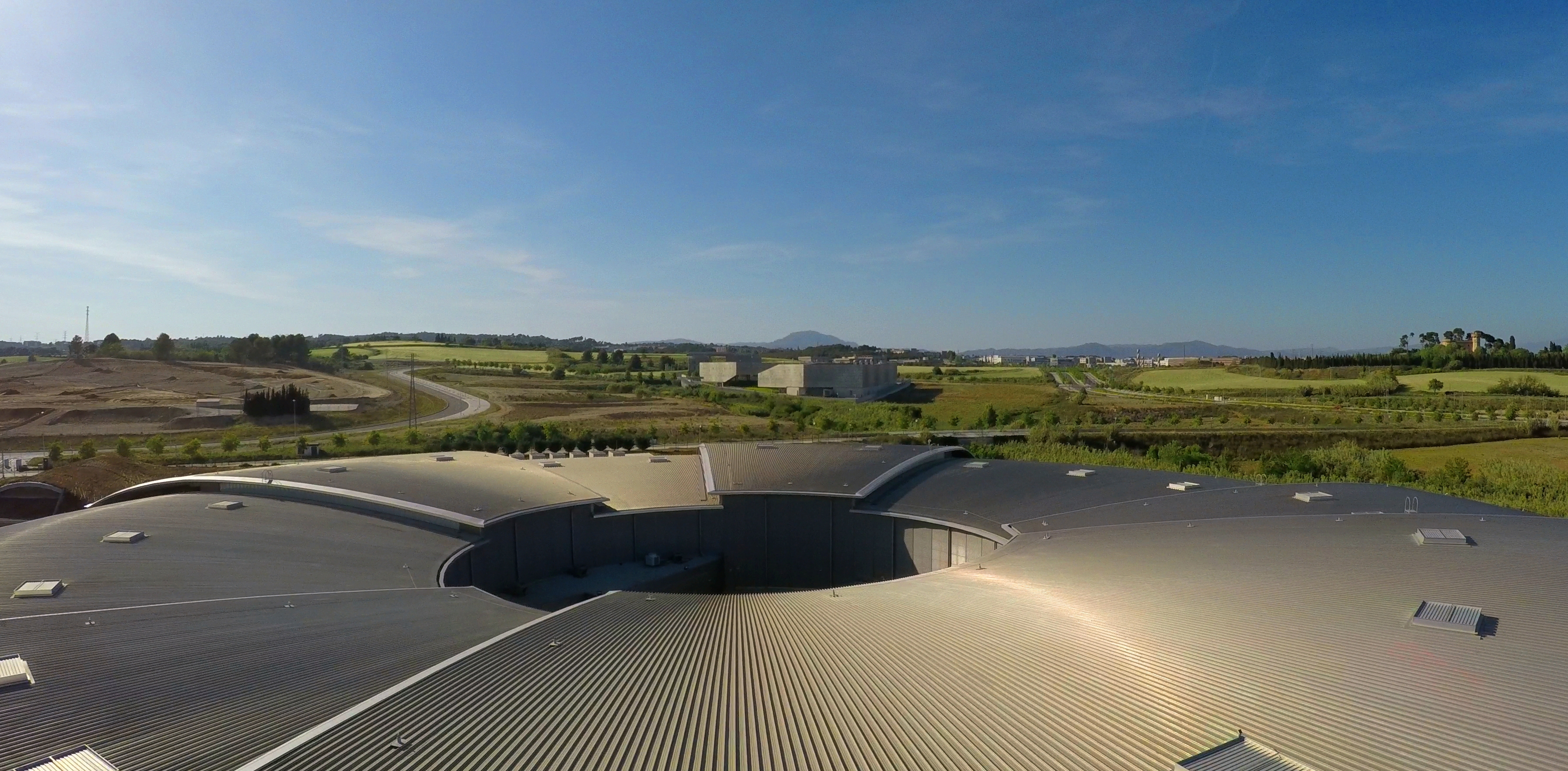
Barcelona Synchrotron Park view

The Barcelona Synchrotron Park (BSP) is a 408-hectare (1.5 square mile) business park centered on the ALBA synchrotron that has been in operation since 2012. It is located on the northern outskirts of Barcelona, at the heart of Àmbit B30, an industrial territory of about 30,000 companies. The Park is a member of the Network of Science and Technology Parks of Catalonia (XPCAT).

BSP is flanked on one side by the Research Park at the Autonomous University of Barcelona (PRUAB) and the Vallès Technology Park (PTV). While roughly half of the Park is designated for high tech companies and both residential and commercial development, a full 189 hectares are devoted to green space. In October 2016, BSP was awarded the Business & Biodiversity label by the European Commission for its agenda in favour of protecting its biodiversity.

Locally known as Parc de l’Alba, BSP is a public consortium between the local city council of Cerdanyola del Vallès and the government of Catalonia through INCASÒL, the agency in charge of the management of public lands.
