= Hiroshima Synchrotron Radiation Center =

Coordinates: 34°24′05″N 132°43′03″E

Sign outside entrance to Hiroshima Synchrotron facility.

The Hiroshima Synchrotron Radiation Center, also known as Hiroshima Synchrotron Orbital Radiation (HiSOR), at Hiroshima University is a national user research facility in Japan. It was founded in 1996 by the University Science Council at Hiroshima University initially as a combined educational and research facility before opening to users in Japan and across the world in 2002. It is the only synchrotron radiation experimental facility located at a national university in Japan. The HiSOR experimental hall contains two undulators that produce light in the ultraviolet to soft x-ray range. A total of 16 beamlines are supported by bending magnet and undulator radiation for use in basic studies of life sciences and physical sciences, especially solid-state physics.

== History ==
Development began with an exploratory committee formed in 1982, which gathered input from Hiroshima University, local agencies, and prefectural agencies. Between 1986 and 1988, several proposals and budget requests were submitted to the Ministry of Education of Japan for a medium-scale synchrotron radiation facility. In 1989, a chair for synchrotron radiation was established at Hiroshima University Graduate School of Science and studies began for the planning of a medium-scale synchrotron radiation source. However, with the approval of SPring-8 just 210 km away, the design emphasis of the project shifted away from the originally planned 1.5 GeV to a compact light source design which would be more complementary to a high-energy accelerator like SPring-8 and more appropriate for a university. The compact synchrotron concept was then renamed as the HSRC, while the storage ring itself would be named HiSOR.

In 1996, the HSRC building was inaugurated and a 10-year research organization plan was developed for HiSOR by the Education and Research Council of Hiroshima University. The intent was to create a facility as part of the Graduate School of Science to serve as both a research and educational tool, specifically supporting master's students in the Department of Physical Sciences. In 1997, the first light from HiSOR was emitted and in 1999, the Okayama University beamline was constructed.

In April 2002, the HSRC was repurposed as a national user facility and the divisions were expanded to basic science, accelerator research, and synchrotron radiation research. As part of the reopening, the HSRC joined the Council for Research Institutes and Centers of Japanese National Universities.

An annual Hiroshima International Symposium on Synchrotron Radiation is held to showcase synchrotron radiation and nanoscience research work from Japan and abroad and for students to promote their dissertation research and HSRC's activities. In terms of outreach, the HSRC also has programs for facility tours, synchrotron radiation training, involvement with high schools, and open lectures to the public.

== Design ==
A microtron developed by Sumitomo Heavy Industries is used as the injection system, an extension of a design concept from the University of Wisconsin. Its compact design uses 2.7 T bending magnets instead of conventional 1.2 T bending magnets, allowing the light to achieve the same power and wavelength as a medium-scale synchrotron without using a higher energy beam.

The HiSOR has two insertion devices, a linear undulator and a helical undulator, in the two linear sections of the ring and has an electron energy of 0.7 GeV with a nominal beam current of 300 mA. The ring itself has a circumference of 22 m. The photon yield is 1.2×10^{11} photons s^{−1} mrad^{−2} at 5 keV, in 0.1% bandwidth, for 300 mA.

== See also ==
- List of synchrotron radiation facilities
