= ALBA (synchrotron) =

Particle accelerator in Catalonia, Spain

Coordinates: 41°29′12″N 2°06′35″E

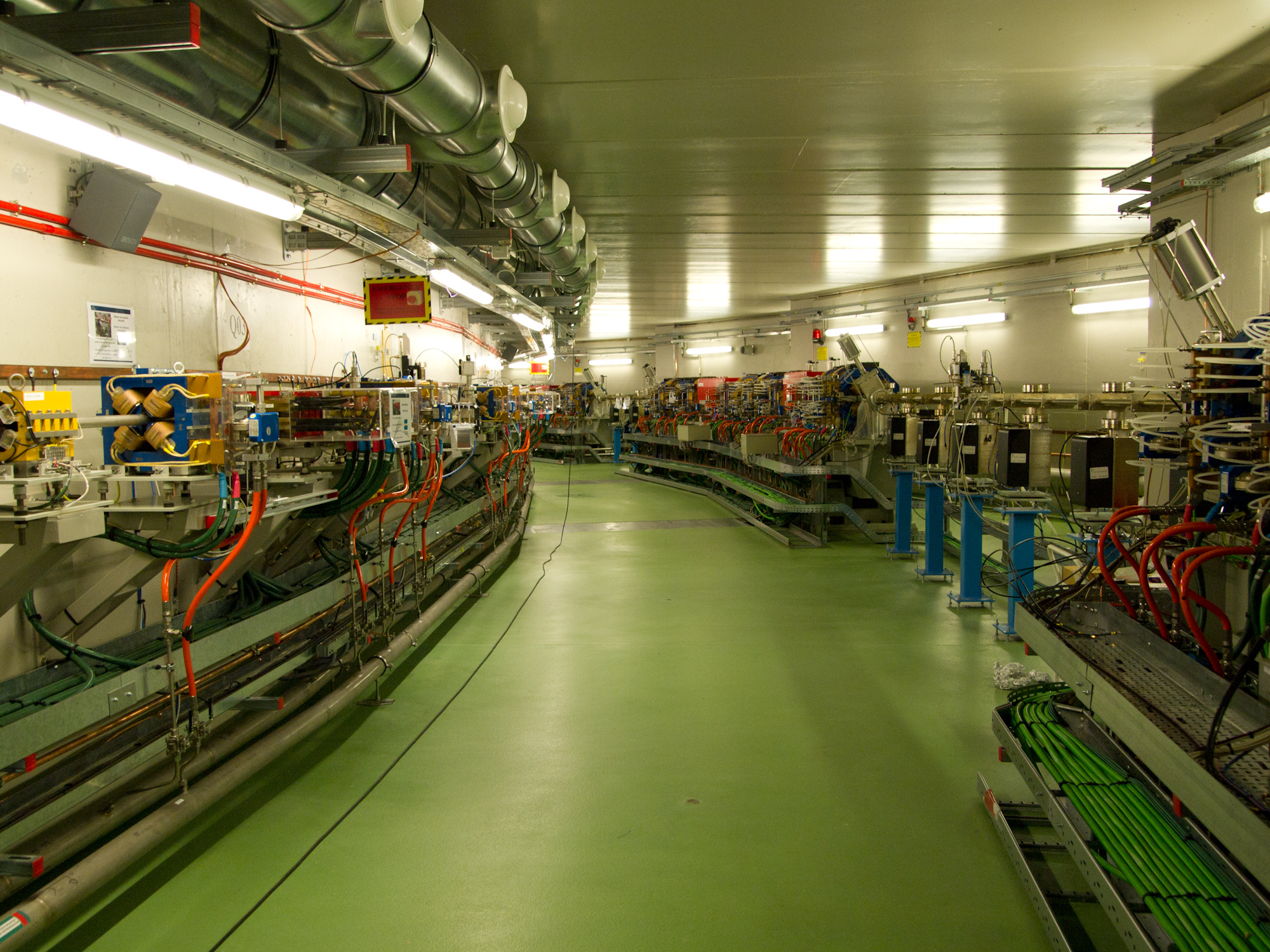
Interior of ALBA synchrotron, September 2010

ALBA (meaning "Sunrise" in Catalan and in Spanish) is a 3 GeV, third-generation synchrotron light source facility located in the Barcelona Synchrotron Park in Cerdanyola del Vallès near Barcelona, in Catalonia, Spain. It was constructed and is operated by CELLS (sp: Consorcio para la Construcción, Equipamiento y Explotación del Laboratorio de Luz de Sincrotrón, the Consortium for the Exploitation of the Synchrotron Light Laboratory), and co-financed by the Spanish central administration and regional Catalan Government.

After nearly ten years of planning and design work by the Spanish scientific community, the project was approved in 2002 by the Spanish and the regional Catalan governments. After scientific workshops and meetings with prospective users, the facility was redesigned in 2004, and in 2006 construction started. The laboratory was officially opened for experiments on seven beamlines in March 2010.

According to lightsources.org, ALBA was opened to users in May 2012.

As of 2023, some of the research done using ALBA includes:

- X-ray microscopy on magnetotactic microorganisms.
- Research into solid catalysts based on isolated metal atoms for the hydroformylation of ethylene.

== History ==
The project was launched in 1994, the construction began in 2003, and the official inauguration took place in March 2010. The total cost of the construction and equipment of the laboratory is estimated at 201.4 million euros. The cost of operating expenses is estimated at 15.5 million euros per year, so according to Joan Bordas, former director of the ALBA, must use about 5,000 of the 8,000 hours that the year has, as the cost of keep it on is the same with nine lines that with 30.

The building that houses the project was completed at the end of 2009 and the complete operation of the facility will advance in successive phases, culminating in 2011. The official inauguration was carried out by the President of the Government José Luis Rodríguez Zapatero and the President of the Government of Catalonia Jose Montilla, together with scientists such as Ramón Pascual, promoter of the project, on 23 March 2010. It is a construction of great technical complexity due to the demands of the installation, which requires mechanical stability, temperature control and quality of the electrical supply. In July 2012, the first analysis experiments began. In its implementation, the ALBA synchrotron has had a demand four times greater than its current capacity (of 8 light lines), mostly by Spanish scientists.

== Chronology ==
1990: First attempt to obtain funding for a synchrotron light source in Spain.

2003: The ALBA Synchrotron project was approved. Funding was divided equally between the Spanish government and the Catalonian Administration. The Consortium for the Construction, Equipping and Exploitation of the Synchrotron Light Source (CELLS) was created to manage the project, and Joan Bordas was appointed as general director.

2006: Construction began after several years for design and for training a group of experts from both Spain and abroad.

2007: The first electrons from the ALBA LINAC electron gun were seen.

2008: The linear accelerator (LINAC) was installed.

2009: The booster and storage ring were installed.

2010: The first operational test of the booster was performed; all components, subsystems and equipment performed in accordance with specifications. The ALBA Synchrotron was inaugurated by the President of the Spanish Government, José Luis Rodríguez Zapatero, and the President of the Generalitat de Catalunya, José Montilla.

2011: An electron beam arrived at a beamline, MISTRAL, for the first time. The first external researcher at the BOREAS beamline helped with the facility's commissioning.

2012: BOREAS, MSPD, XALOC, NCD and CIRCE beamlines received their first official users. In July, Caterina Biscari was appointed as the new director of the ALBA Synchrotron. At the end of the year, the first ALBA publication was released: a report containing data collected from the MSPD beamline.

2013: By the beginning of 2013, the seven beamlines had received official users.

== Beamlines ==
=== BL01 – MIRAS: Infrared microspectroscopy ===
MIRAS is for Fourier-transform infrared (FTIR) spectroscopy and microscopy. FTIR is a way to identify the infrared spectrum of absorption or emission of a material and thus its chemical composition.

The beamline has a synchrotron-based infrared spectrometer and microscope capacity covering a wavelength range from around 1 μm to ~100 μm with an spectral region designed at first for investigation between 2.5 and 14 μm.

Reflection, attenuated total reflection (ATR), transmission, and angle of incidence are used for sample analysis at this beamline.

=== BL04 – MSPD: Materials science and powder diffraction beamline ===
The materials science and powder diffraction beamline is for high-resolution powder diffraction and high pressure powder diffraction using diamond anvil cells.

The beamline works between 8 and 50 keV. This energy range adequately covers the desirable range for almost any powder diffraction experiment, and at the same time it is possible to perform both total scattering experiments, and high pressure diffraction, for which it is not only desirable but sometimes necessary to have high-energy sources (E>30 KeV).

There are two experimental end stations to accommodate the different experimental techniques, one devoted to high resolution powder diffraction and the second one is dedicated to high pressure experiments.

=== BL09 – MISTRAL: Soft X-ray microscopy ===
"The full-field transmission X-ray microscopy beamline MISTRAL is devoted to cryo nano-tomography in the water window and multi-keV spectral regions (E = 270eV – 2600eV) for biological applications. In addition, spectroscopic imaging (a series of 2D images over a range of X-ray wavelengths) at several interesting X-ray absorption edges can be performed.

The transmission X-ray microscope (TXM) works from 270 eV to 1200 eV. A single-reflection elliptical glass capillary condenser focuses monochromatic light on to the sample, which is at cryo-temperature. The transmitted signal is collected by an objective Fresnel zone plate (of 25 or 40 nm outermost zone widths) and a magnified image is delivered to a direct illumination CCD camera. The routinely expected spatial resolution in 2D is 30 nm and ≈50 nm for tomographies. An upgrade of the microscope to higher energies (i.e. Zernike phase contrast at 2600 eV) is planned, as well as the development of correlated fluorescence visible light microscopy."

=== BL11 – NCD-SWEET: Non-crystalline diffraction ===
Small-angle X-ray scattering (SAXS) experiments provide structural and dynamic information of large molecular assemblies like polymers, colloids, proteins and fibres. A wide range of fields (medicine, biology, chemistry, physics, archaeological, environmental and conservation sciences and materials) can be covered by this technique. SAXS is a powerful technique that is used to study the supramolecular organization in biological systems, the structure and function of muscle filaments, corneal transparency, biological membranes, polymer processing, self assembly of mesoscopic metal particles, colloids, inorganic aggregates, liquid crystals and devices.

Recording SAXS and WAXS (wide-angle X-ray scattering) simultaneously results in a length scale which ranges from a few microns to a few angstroms.

=== BL13 – XALOC: Macromolecular crystallography ===
XALOC is designed to provide Structural Biology groups with a tool for finding solutions for structures of macromolecules and complexes. The beamline allows a broad variety of crystal sizes and unit cell parameters, with both wavelength-dependent and -independent experiments.

=== BL22 – CLÆSS: Core level absorption and emission spectroscopies ===
The CLÆSS beamline provides a simultaneous and unified access to two complementary techniques: X-ray absorption and emission spectroscopes. The incoming energy range is 2.4–63.2 keV. The outcoming energy range selectable by the CLEAR spectrometer is 6.4–12.5 keV.

The sample set-ups give access to low/high-temperature (10–320 K, 80–1000 K), low/high-energy measurements (in transmission and fluorescence mode), "in situ" solid-gas reactors.

=== BL24 – CIRCE: Photoemission spectroscopy and microscopy ===
BL24 – CIRCE is a variable-polarization soft X-ray beamline dedicated to advanced photoemission experiments.

=== BL29 – BOREAS: Resonant absorption and scattering ===
The variable polarization soft X-ray beamline is dedicated to fundamental, as well as applied, polarization-dependent spectroscopic investigation of advanced materials.

== Expansion ==
As of November 2020, three beamlines are under construction: LOREA, XAIRA, and NOTOS. A fourth, FAXTOR, is being designed.

== See also ==
- European Synchrotron Radiation Facility
