= Nanotomography =

Nanotomography, much like its related modalities tomography and microtomography, uses x-rays to create cross-sections from a 3D-object that later can be used to recreate a virtual model without destroying the original model, applying Nondestructive testing. The term nano is used to indicate that the pixel sizes of the cross-sections are in the nanometer range

Nano-CT beamlines have been built at 3rd generation synchrotron radiation facilities, including the Advanced Photon Source of Argonne National Laboratory, SPring-8, and ESRF from early 2000s. They have been applied to wide variety of three-dimensional visualization studies, such as those of comet samples returned by the Startdust mission, mechanical degradation in lithium-ion batteries, and neuron deformation in schizophrenic brains.

Although a lot of research is done to create nano-CT scanners, currently there are only a few available commercially. The SkyScan-2011 has a range of about 150 to 250 nanometers per pixel with a resolution of 400 nm and a field of view (FOV) of 200 micrometers. The Xradia nanoXCT has a spatial resolution of better than 50 nm and a FOV of 16 micrometers.

At the Ghent University, the UGCT team developed a nano-CT scanner based on commercially available components. The UGCT facility is an open nano-CT facility giving access to scientists from universities, institutes and industry.
