= Laboratório Nacional de Luz Síncrotron =

Brazilian research institute

Laboratório Nacional de Luz Síncroton Brazilian Synchrotron Light Laboratory
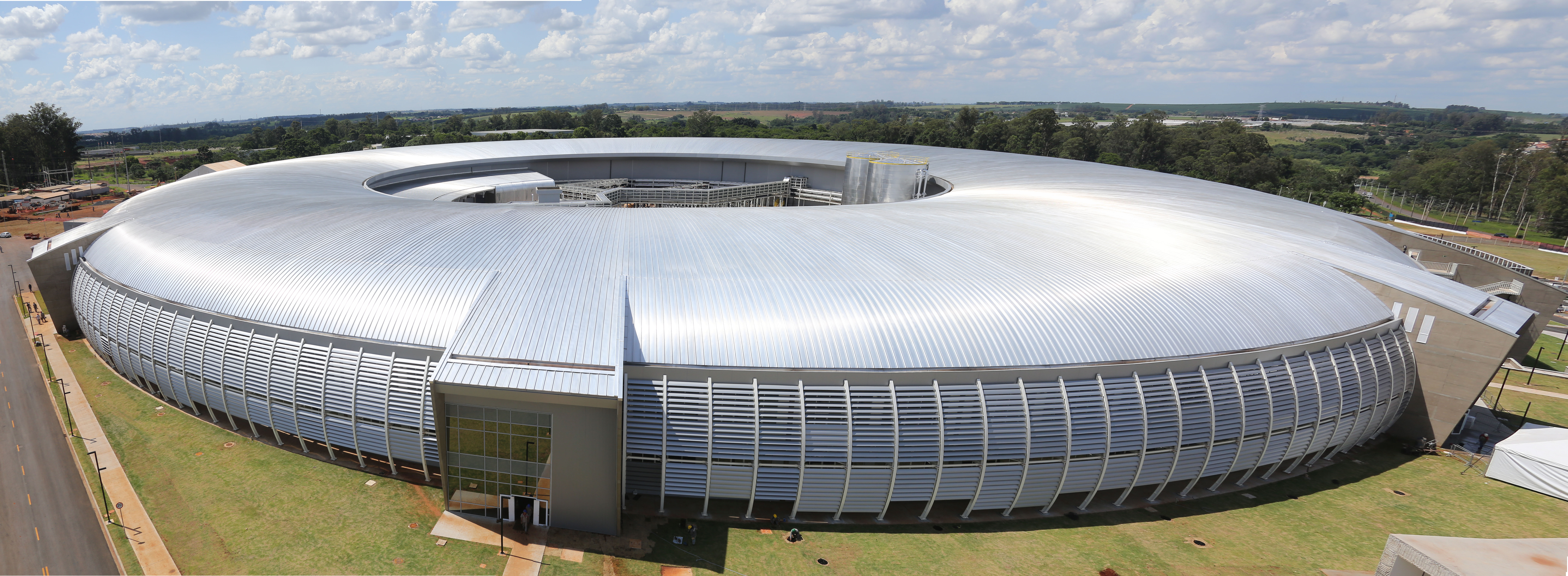
- The Sirius particle accelerator building completed in November 2018
- Established: 1997
- Research type: high-energy physics
- Director: Harry Westfahl Jr.
- Location: Campinas, São Paulo, Brazil; 22°48′14″S 47°03′14″W
- Website: www.lnls.cnpem.br

Laboratório Nacional de Luz Síncrotron (Brazilian Portuguese pronunciation: [laboɾɐˈtɔɾi.u nasi.oˈnaw dʒi ˈlus ˈsĩkɾotɾõ, laboɾɐˈtɔɾju nasjoˈnaw -]; LNLS) is the Brazilian Synchrotron Light Laboratory, a research institution on physics, chemistry, material science and life sciences. It is located in the city of Campinas, sub-district of Barão Geraldo, interior of the state of São Paulo, Brazil.

It is the second fourth-generation particle accelerator in the world, but the most modern for several reasons, mainly because it emits light with the most intense brightness and has superior analytical capabilities.

== Laboratory ==
The center, which is operated by the Brazilian Center of Research in Energy and Materials (CNPEM) under a contract with the National Research Council (CNPq) and the Ministry of Science and Technology of Brazil, has the only particle accelerator (a synchrotron) in Latin America, which was designed and built in Brazil by a team of physicists, technicians and engineers.

== Uses ==
Currently, the Brazilian Synchrotron has 6 different beamlines in operation for its user community, covering energies ranging from a few electronvolts to tens of kiloelectronvolts. The uses include:

- X-Ray Nanoscopy
- Coherent and Time-resolsed X-ray Scattering
- X-ray Spectroscopy e Diffraction in Extreme Conditions
- Infrared Micro and Nanospectroscopy
- Resonant Inelastic X-ray scattering and Photoelectron spectroscopy
- Macromolecular Micro and Nanocrystallography

These beamlines are part of Sirius, a 3 GeV synchrotron light source. The plan includes an initial 13 beamlines, with a final goal of 40, ranging from 10 eV to 100 keV. It was inaugurated in 2018.

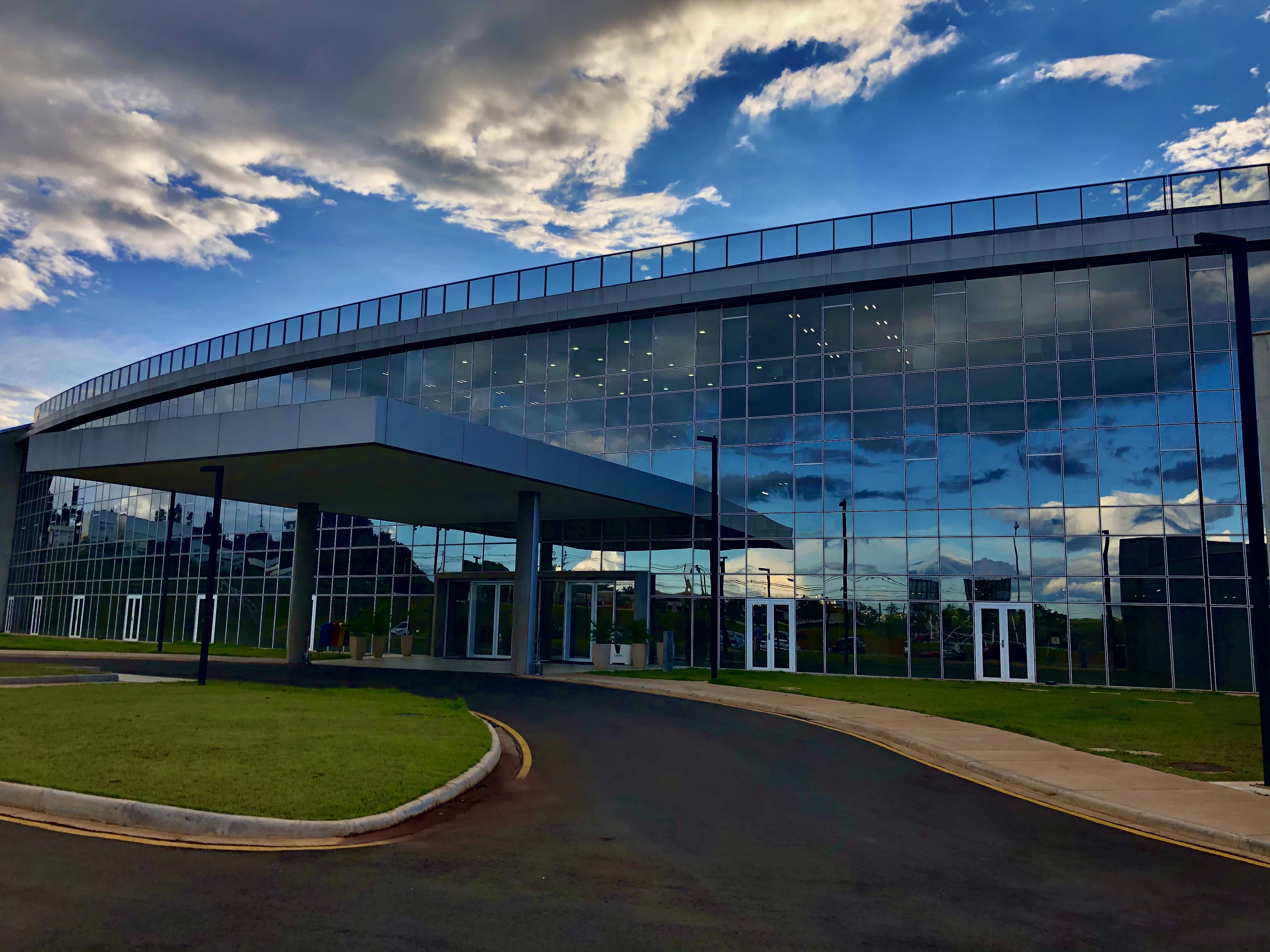
Sirius Synchrotron Entrance
