= ASTRID2 =

Synchroton light source at Aarhus University

Coordinates: 56°10′3.558″N 10°11′54.369″E

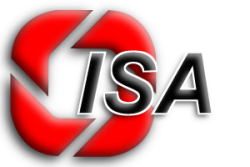
Centre for Storage Ring Facilities in Aarhus logo

ASTRID2 is a synchrotron light source at the Department of Physics and Astronomy of Aarhus University. ASTRID2 was designed, constructed and is operated by the Centre for Storage Ring Facilities in Aarhus (ISA).

== The ASTRID2 synchrotron light source ==
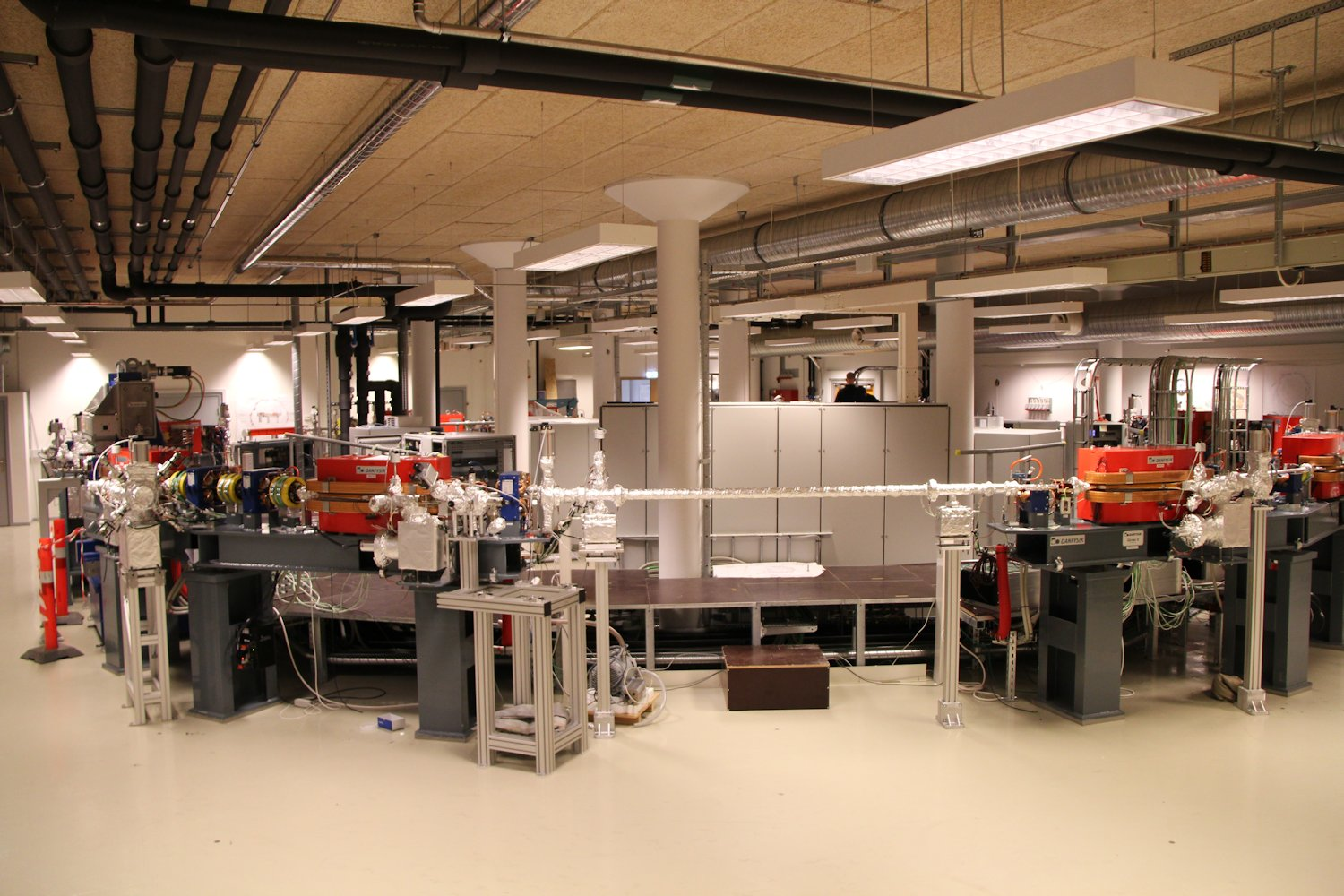
ASTRID2 as it looked in March 2012

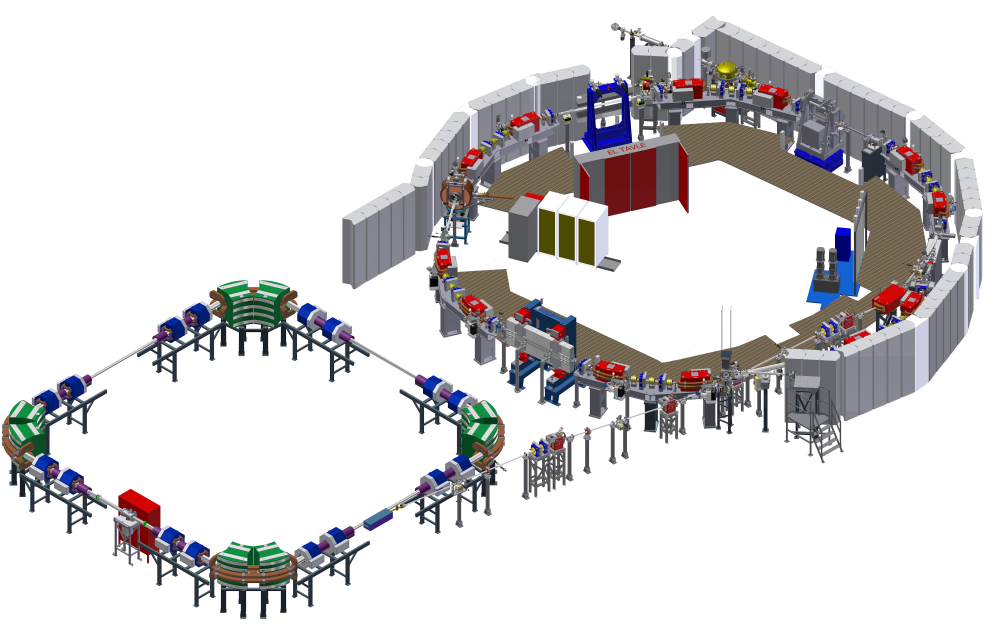
3D rendering of ASTRID2

In 2008 ISA was awarded money to build a new high brilliance synchrotron storage ring, ASTRID2, to replace the older light source ASTRID (see below). The third generation light source generates synchrotron radiation to provide a tuneable beam of light, with wavelengths from the ultraviolet through to soft x-rays.

It has a natural emittance of 12 nm, more than ten times smaller than the old ASTRID source. Construction of the ring began in 2011 and by April 2012 the whole ring was under vacuum and ready for testing. The first beam was injected into the ASTRID2 ring on Monday the 14th of May 2012 and the first full turn of ASTRID2 was accomplished on Tuesday the 10th of July 2012. On the 2nd of November 2012 a stored beam with RF was achieved for the first time. Commissioning of ASTRID2 proceeded well in 2013 and on the 13th of September 2013 200 mA of current was stored in ASTRID2 with top-up at 200 mA successful, with the first external user doing experiments on the AU-UV beam line just a few months later. 2014 saw the commissioning of the AU-SGM3, AU-Matline and AU-CD beam lines, upgraded and transferred from ASTRID, with all beam lines fully operational by mid 2014. In early 2016 a brand new beam line, AMOLine, was commissioned, with the latest beam line, AU-SGM4, commissioned in 2019.

== Technical details ==
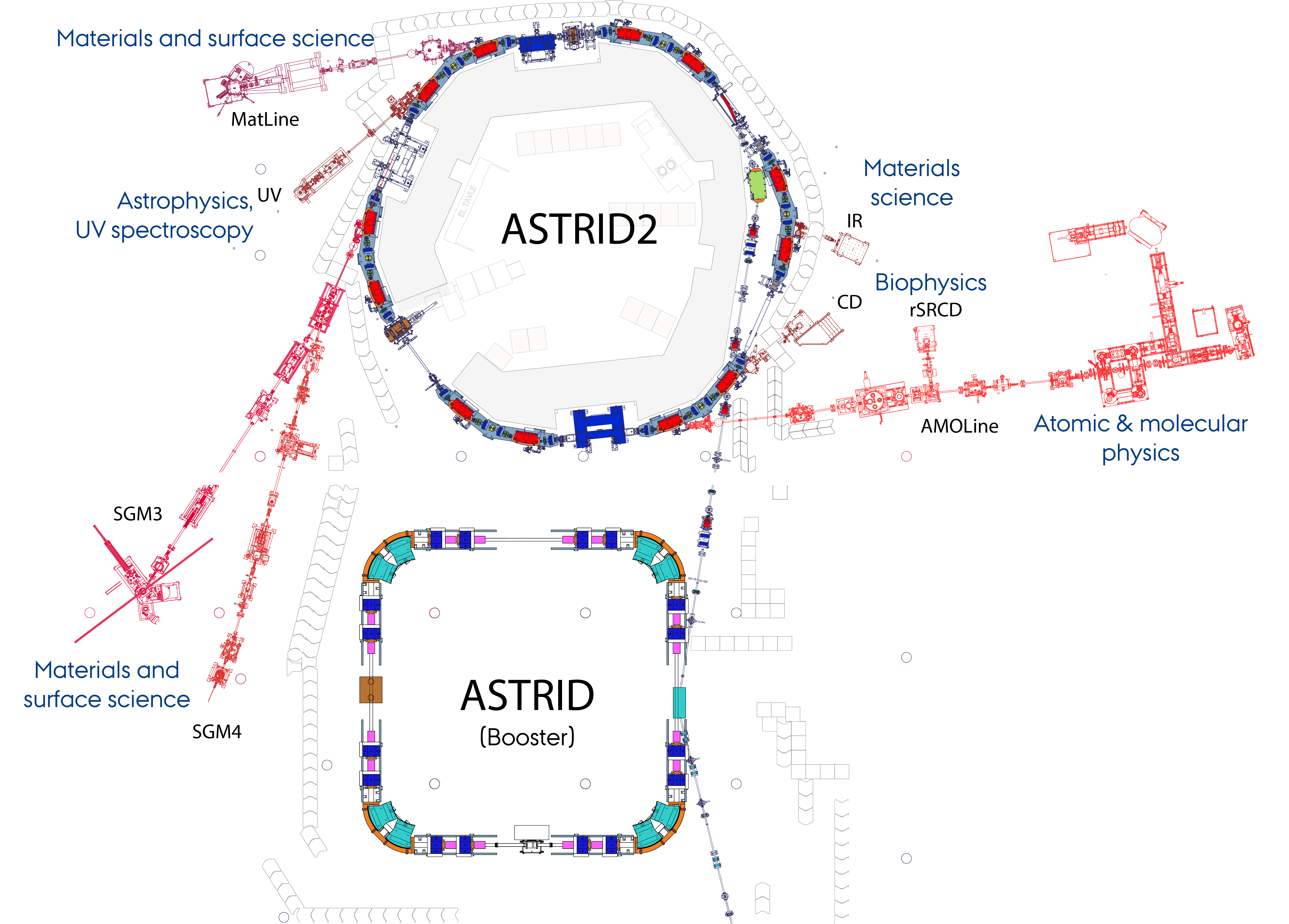
Schematic overview of the ASTRID2 facility

The storage ring ASTRID2 with a circumference of 45.7 m is sited in a purpose built hall, next to the old ASTRID ring. ASTRID2 has a hexagonal structure with 12 combined function 30° magnets mounted as 6 double achromatic units placed on girders with quadrupoles, sextupoles, and correctors, which enhance the brilliance of the radiation by two or more orders of magnitude. With two straight sections used for RF and injection, there are four straight sections of up to 2.9 m in length available for insertion devices.

Electrons are produced in a 100 MeV racetrack microtron, injected into the ASTRID booster ring and then ramped up to an energy of 580 MeV. The beam is then transported to ASTRID2 via a 21-m-long beamline from ASTRID, which passes under a section of the ASTRID2 ring, Electrons are injected at the storage energy of ASTRID2 (580 MeV), therefore allowing for continuous top-up for maintaining a quasi-constant electron current.

There are currently four beamlines from insertion devices on ASTRID2 together with three beamlines from bending magnets. ASTRID2 operates at 580 MeV and is optimised for photon energies from the visible to around 1 keV (1 nm). Parameters are shown in the table below, with those for the old source, ASTRID included, for comparison.

=== Technical parameters ===
The table below shows the typical operating parameters for ASTRID2, compared with those for ASTRID when it ran in electron storage mode.

Parameter	ASTRID2	ASTRID
Maximum Energy / MeV	580	580
Max. Current / mA	290 (2017)	286 (2005)
Typical Stored Current / mA	180	180–220
Lifetime (at 160 mA)	Infinite (top-up)	100–120 hours
Horizontal emittance / nm	12	140
RF Frequency / MHz	104.9	104.9
No. of bunches	16	14
SR critical energy / keV	0.238	0.38
Straight sections (length / m)	6 (2.9)	4 (2.0)

== Beamlines on ASTRID2 ==
There are seven operational SR beamlines on ASTRID2. The characteristics of the beamlines are summarised in the table below and their location shown in the schematic drawing. Please follow the links in the table for further information and descriptions of the individual beamlines.

The ASTRID2 beamlines
Station	Source	Spectral Range (λ) (Note: Conversions between eV and nm are italicized.)			Resolving power	Typical flux (10^{11} photons/sec)	Applications
Station	Source	eV	nm	gratings	Resolving power	Typical flux (10^{11} photons/sec)	Applications
AU-MatLine	Multipole Wiggler	20–700	1.8–62	2	200-3500	1	Materials and Surface Science
AU-AMOLine	Undulator	15–150	8.3–248	2	10,000-25,000	10–1,000	Atomic and Molecular Physics
AU-SGM3	Undulator	12–150	8.3–103	3	15,000	2	Materials and Surface Science
AU-SGM4	Undulator	12–150	8.3–103	3	15,000	2	Materials and Surface Science
AU-UV	Bending magnet	1.8–12	105–700	2	1,000–5,000	2	CD Spectroscopy, Photobiology, UV Spectroscopy
AU-CD	Bending magnet	1.8–9.9	125–700	1	<500	10	Biophysics, CD Spectroscopy
AU-IR	Edge radiation from a bending magnet	0.062–2	620–20,000	1	<0.5 cm^{−1} (Spectrometer)	100	Biology, condensed materials

== ASTRID ==
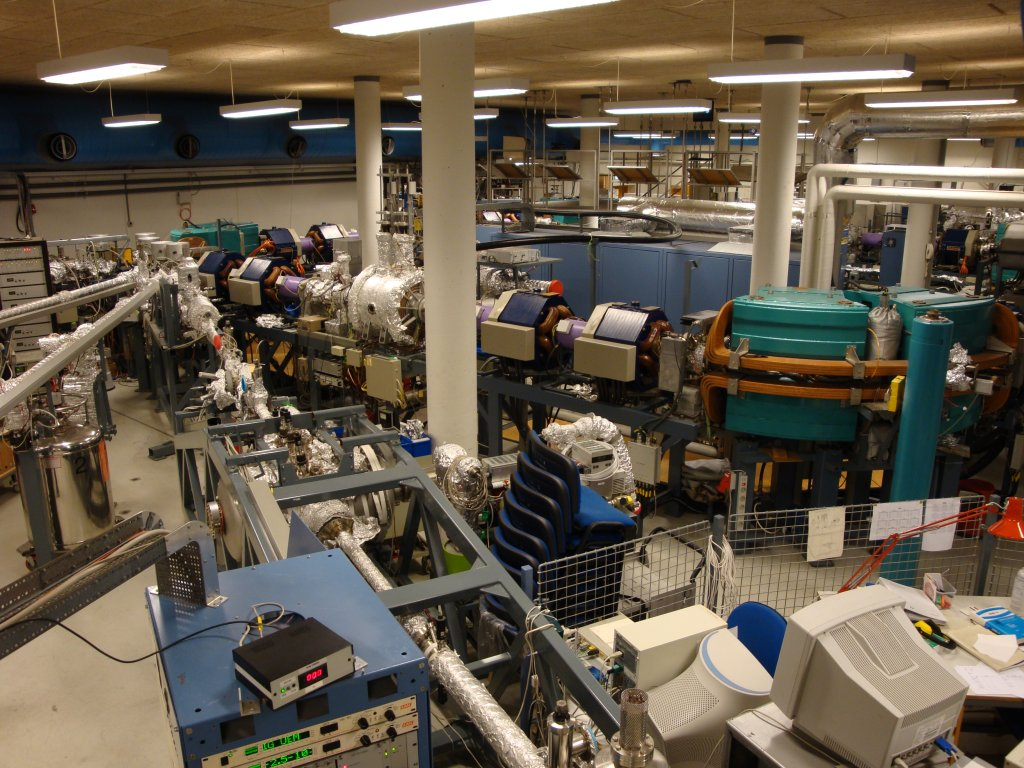
ASTRID as it looked in 2010

The ASTRID storage ring operated from 1989 to 2013, replaced by the 3rd generation ASTRID2 light source. The ring is now used as the booster injection ring for ASTRID2. Designs for ASTRID started in 1985. The original concept for the ring was to store low-energy heavy ions for laser spectroscopic and laser cooling experiments and for atomic collision studies. It was soon realised during the design phase that it would also be possible to store energetic electron beams in the ring and therefore ASTRID could operate as a synchrotron radiation (SR) source, providing photons in the UV to soft x-ray region. In 1988 the Natural Sciences Faculty at Aarhus University was awarded 16.7 M DKK for establishing an Instrument centre in Synchrotron Radiation Research, thus forming ISA. By late 1989 ASTRID was operating in ion storage mode with the first experiments being carried out on laser cooling a stored beam of Li^{+} ions to 1 mK .

Electrons were first stored in ASTRID in 1991 and by this time two beamlines had been constructed to make use of the synchrotron light, a surface science beamline (SX700) and an x-ray microscope (XM). Ion storage in ASTRID dominated in the early 90s, with many successful experiments storing both positive and negative ions ranging in mass from 1 (hydrogen atom) to 840 (carbon 70 cluster). Meanwhile, the synchrotron radiation based research at ISA was expanding, and by 1995 ASTRID was operated 50% of the time in ion storage mode and 50% for synchrotron radiation. With the construction of the Electrostatic Storage Ring for Ions (ELISA) in 1998, and an increasing demand for synchrotron radiation (by 2000 there were 7 beamlines on ASTRID using the light source), the ion storage runs were gradually reduced, until finally in 2005 ASTRID operated in ion storage mode for the last time. ASTRID then operated in electron storage mode producing synchrotron radiation throughout the year, with 3 or 4 electron runs, separated by shutdown periods for maintenance and development of the ring, until 2013 when the new ASTRID2 source became operational.

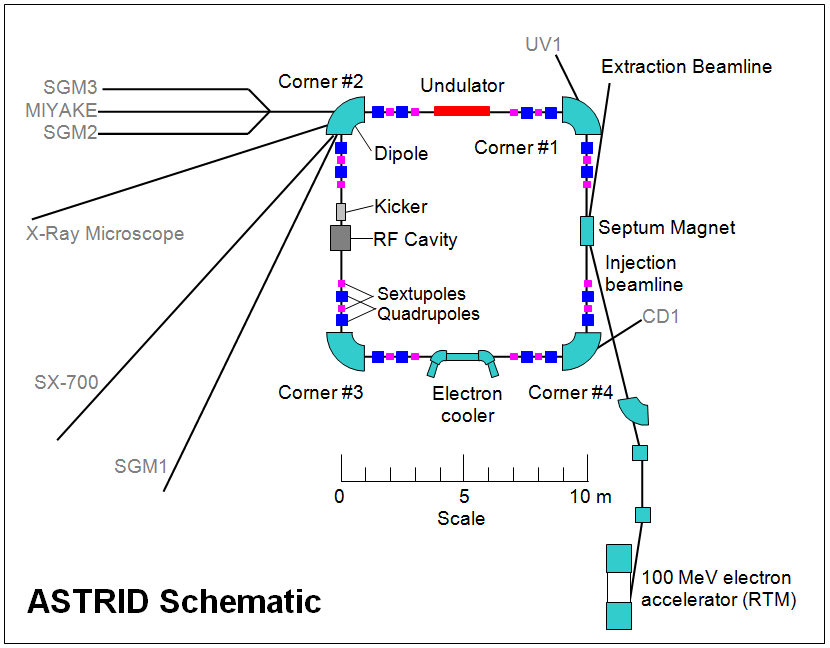
ASTRID schematic

The ASTRID storage "ring", with a circumference of only 40 m, is actually a square, formed by four sets of two 45 degree dipole bending magnets. There are eight pairs of quadrupole magnets used for horizontal and vertical focusing of the electrons and eight pairs of sextupole magnets for chromaticity correction. Electrons are injected via a septum magnet into the ring from a 100 MeV race-track microtron in 4-5 mA pulses, and captured by a 105 MHz RF system which bunches and accelerates the electrons as they pass through the RF cavity. Many of these pulses of electrons were accumulated at 100 MeV to reach more than 180 mA of current in the ring, which was then accelerated to 580 MeV with negligible loss of beam. The lifetime of a stored beam at 160 mA was 100 to 120 hours.

== See also ==
- Synchrotron Radiation Source
- Synchrotron
