= Sirius (synchrotron light source) =

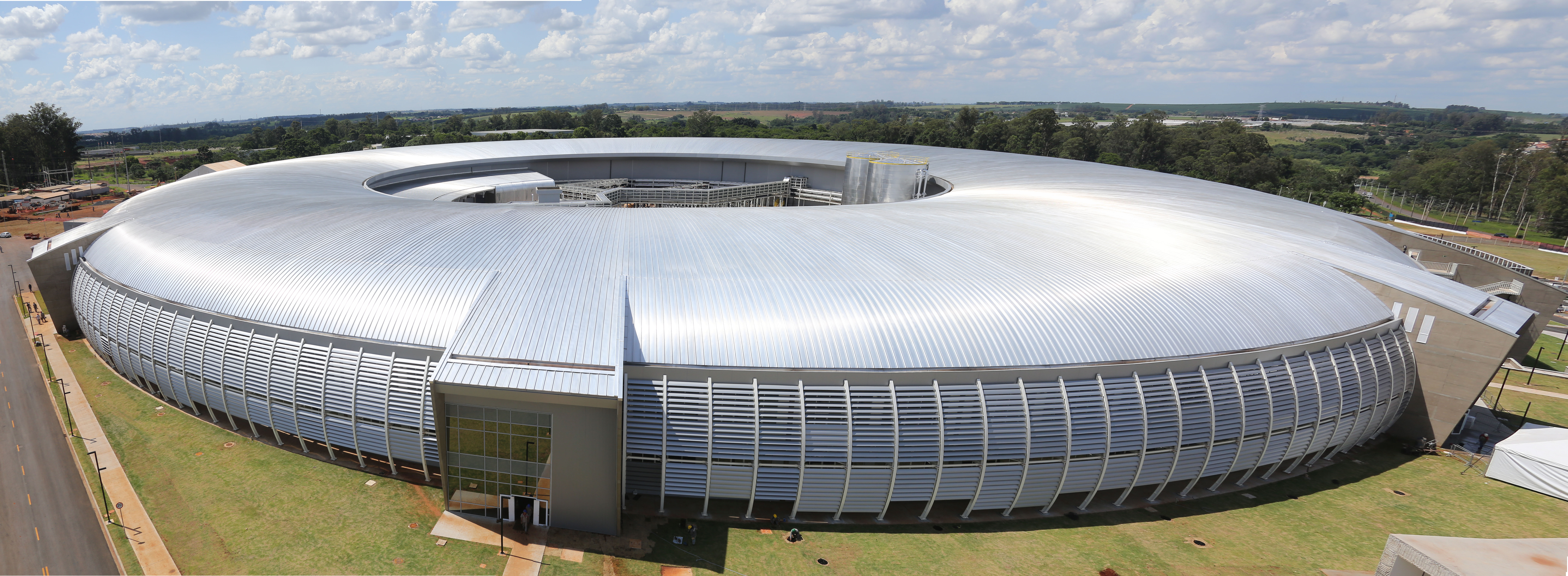
- Sirius synchrotron lightsource building completed in November 2018

General properties
- Accelerator type: diffraction-limited storage ring

Beam properties
- Maximum energy: 3 GeV
- Maximum current: 350 mA (currently 200 mA in top-up mode)

Physical properties
- Circumference: 518,4 m
- Location: Campinas
- Coordinates: 22°48′28″S 47°03′09″W
- Institution: Laboratório Nacional de Luz Síncrotron
- Preceded by: UVX

Sirius is a diffraction-limited storage ring synchrotron light source at the Brazilian Synchrotron Light Laboratory (LNLS) in Campinas, São Paulo State, Brazil. It has a circumference of 518.4 metres (1,701 ft), a diameter of 165 metres (541 ft), and an electron energy of 3 GeV. The produced synchrotron radiation covers the range of infrared, optical, ultraviolet and X-ray light.

Costing R$1.8 billion, it was funded by the Ministry of Science, Technology, Innovation and Communications (Brazil) and the São Paulo Research Foundation. Discussion started in 2008, and initial funding of R$2 million was granted in 2009. Construction started in 2015, and was finished in 2018. The first electron loop around the storage ring was achieved in November 2019. Its first experiments were made during COVID-19 pandemic at MANACÁ beamline, dedicated to macromolecular crystallography.

Sirius is the second synchrotron lightsource constructed in Brazil. The first one, UVX, was a second-generation machine operated by LNLS from 1997 to 2019.

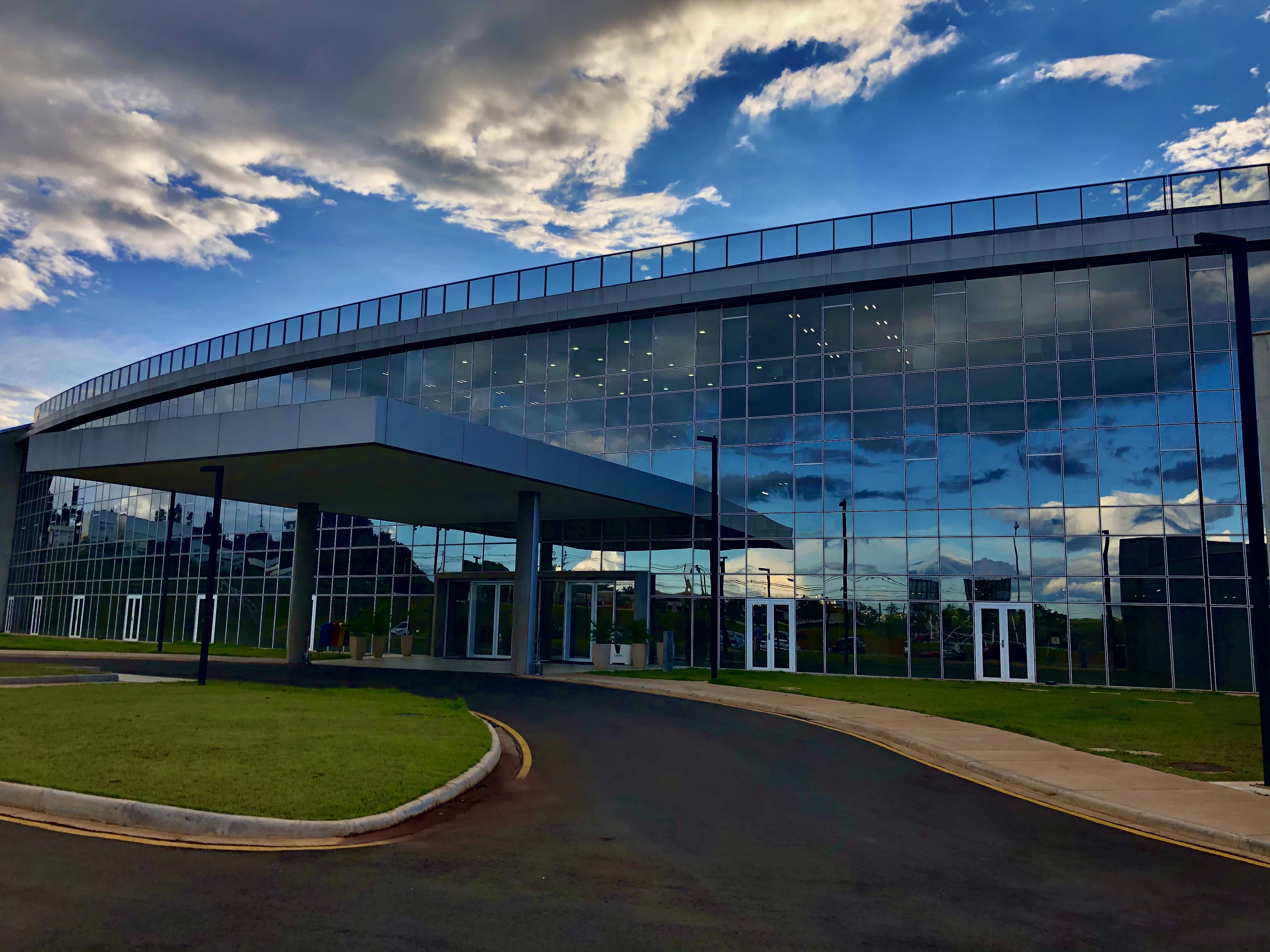
Main Entrance.

== History ==
In 2008, LNLS former director José Antônio Brum asked for a preview of a new accelerator, which was then shown to the minister of science Sérgio Machado Rezende. Construction began in 2014 under the Dilma Rousseff government. Sirius is the second operational particle accelerator in Brazil, the first one being the UVX..

The first part of the complex was inaugurated on 14 November 2018 by then-president Michel Temer, and included the main building and two of the three accelerators. The second part included the third accelerator, the storage ring and the commissioning of the first beamlines. Sirius currently operates at 200mA in top-up mode and has 6 beamlines open to external researchers.

== Characteristics ==
Sirius is used to understand the atomic structure of molecules, which can help in the development of new drugs, new materials used in construction, oil exploration and in many other areas. The 68,000-square-meter building houses a ring-shaped, circumferential 500-meter facility. To protect people from the radiation released by machine operation, designed to be the most advanced of its kind in the world, the whole is shielded by 1 kilometer of concrete walls. Around R$1.8 billion were invested in the project, which makes it the most ambitious scientific project ever made in Brazil.

== Beamlines ==
Currently, Sirius has 9 operational beamlines, 1 in scientific commissioning, 2 in the assembly phase and 1 the design phase.

Beamline	Main Technique	Energy Range	Status
CARNAÚBA	X-Ray Nanoscopy	2.05 - 15 keV	Operational
CATERETÊ	Coherent and Time-resolsed X-ray Scattering	3 - 24 keV	Operational
CEDRO	Circular Dichroism	3 - 9 eV	Operational
EMA	X-ray Spectroscopy and Diffraction in Extreme Conditions	2.7 - 30 keV	Operational
IMBUIA	Infrared Micro and Nanospectroscopy	70 meV - 400 meV	Operational
IPÊ	Resonant Inelastic X-ray scattering and Photoelectron spectroscopy	100 - 2000 eV	Operational
JATOBÁ	Full X-ray Scattering and PDF Analysis	40 - 70 keV	Design
MANACÁ	Macromolecular Micro and Nanocrystallography	5 - 20 keV	Operational
MOGNO	X-ray Micro- and Nanotomography	22 | 39 | 67.5 keV	Operation
PAINEIRA	Powder X-ray Diffraction	5 - 30 keV	Operational
QUATI	X-ray Spectroscopy with Temporal Resolution	4.5 - 35 keV	Assembly
SABIÁ	Soft X-Ray Absorption Spectroscopy and Imaging	100 - 2000 eV	Operational
SAPÊ	Angle-Resolved PhotoEmission Spectroscopy	8 - 70 eV	Commissioning
SAPUCAIA	Small Angle X-ray Scattering	6 - 17 keV	Assembly
