= Ilan Ben-Zvi =

American accelerator physicist

- אילן בן צבי
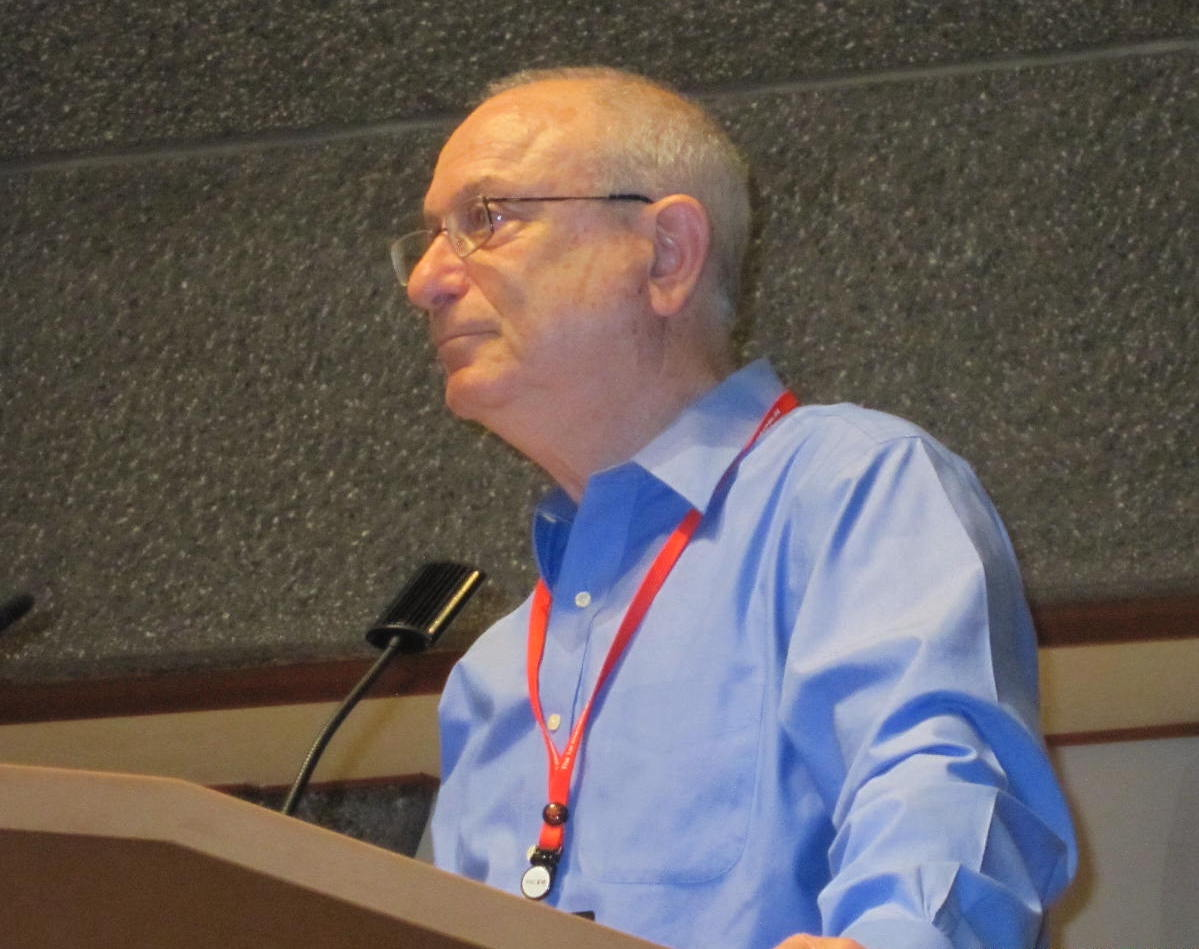
- Born: 1941 (age 84–85); Israel

Academic background
- Education: B.S., Mathematics and Physics; M.S., Physics; Ph.D., Nuclear Physics
- Alma mater: Hebrew University of Jerusalem; Weizmann Institute of Science

Ilan Ben-Zvi (Hebrew: אילן בן צבי) is an accelerator physicist and academic. He was the associate chair for accelerator R&D at the Collider-Accelerator Department (C-AD) and is a distinguished scientist emeritus at the Collider-Accelerator Department (C-AD) at Brookhaven National Laboratory.

Ben-Zvi is most known for his work on accelerator physics, experimental physics, and beam physics. He has authored or co-authored over 650 papers. Ben-Zvi was awarded the 2007 Free-electron laser Prize for his contributions to the field of Free-Electron Lasers. In 2023 he was given the Dieter Möhl Medal "Dieter Möhl Awards 2023". Cool Conference 2023 (CERN). for his outstanding contributions to the development of high-energy electron cooling. Ben-Zvi is a Life Fellow of the Institute of Electrical and Electronics Engineers.

== Early life and education ==
Ilan Ben-Zvi grew up in Rishon LeZion. His maternal great-grandfather was Aharon Mordechai Freimann, one of the town founders. He attended Haviv Elementary School, was a amateur radio operator 4X4JL. Ben-Zvi completed his Bachelor's with Distinction in 1965 in Physics and Mathematics at the Hebrew University of Jerusalem. In 1970, he obtained a Ph.D. in Physics from the Weizmann Institute of Science under the supervision of Gvirol Goldring.

== Career ==
Ben-Zvi worked on beam physics and in a large number of universities, national laboratories and particle accelerators.

After his doctorate, Ben-Zvi joined the superconducting radio frequency (SRF) at Stanford University's High Energy Physics Laboratory, where he participated in the early development of superconducting linear accelerators, developed the reentrant cavity, beam dynamics of heavy ion linacs and the first code for the Multipactor effect.

In 1975 he returned to the Weizmann Institute, where he founded a cryogenic technology laboratory and developed accelerator components for the institute's electrostatic accelerator, including a chopper-buncher system with an emittance-independent chopper, harmonic buncher, and superconducting re-buncher.

As a visiting associate professor at Stony Brook University (1980-1982), he was part of the team that built the university's superconducting heavy-ion linac, where he developed the first superconducting Quarter Wave Resonator (QWR)., a cavity geometry since adopted at low-velocity SRF linacs worldwide. He subsequently contributed to the superconducting heavy-ion booster at the University of Washington on new types of Quarter Wave Resonators, superconducting resonator controllers and cryostats. At the Laboratori Nazionali di Legnaro Ben-Zvi introduced the SRF QWR, enabling the ALPI machine. At DESY he developed the current leads for the superconducting HERA (particle accelerator).

Returning to Stony Brook University as a Visiting Professor (1988-1990) he developed the first SRF Radio Frequency Quadrupole, which was tested and formed the basis for the PIAVE injector of ALPI.

Ben-Zvi joined Brookhaven National Laboratory in 1988, receiving tenure in the National Synchrotron Light Source in 1991. There he led the construction of the Accelerator Test Facility (ATF), originally established by Robert Palmer and Claudio Pellegrini, served as its director for fifteen years and eventually elevated it to a United States Department of Energy National User Facility. From 2005 to 2018 he was Associate Chair for Accelerator R&D of BNL's Collider-Accelerator Department, and he was appointed Distinguished Scientist Emeritus in 2018. He served as a BNL Professor at Stony Brook University from 2010 to 2020.

At the ATF Ben-Zvi pioneered laser acceleration of particles, advanced beam instrumentation and laser-beam interactions. He also led various aspects of Free-electron laser, including the High-Gain Harmonic Generation FEL, high brightness electron sources, and laser photocathodes. Other projects include developing electron cooling for the RHIC collider, as well as carry out research and development for the Electron-Ion Collider.

Ben-Zvi invented the double quarter wave crab cavity, and led the team which built and tested its first prototype. This cavity is now part of the luminosity upgrade of the LHC.

On Sabbatical leave at CERN (2016-2018) Ben-Zvi tested superconducting cavities. developed self-excited loop cavity control system and ferroelectric fast reactive tuners.

== Community service ==
Ilan Ben-Zvi served the accelerator and beam physics community in various capacities. Some examples follow:

- At the Division of Physics of Beams of the American Physical Society he Served as the Secretary-Treasurer from 1999 to 2002, was a member of the committee which established the journal Physical Review Accelerators and Beams (PR-AB), then served on the inaugural Editorial Board of PR-AB and as Divisional Associate Editor for Physical Review Letters, from 2010 to 2016. PR-AB
- At the Institute of Electrical and Electronics Engineers Nuclear and Physics Plasma Society (NPSS) Ben-Zvi Served as Chair, Particle Accelerator Science and Technology Committee, of the NPSS from 2005 to 2009. In this capacity he established the Particle Accelerator Science and Technology Doctoral Student Award and served as chair of its prize committee from 2008 for ten years. He also chaired the NPSS Particle Accelerator Science and Technology Award Committee starting in 2005 for thirteen years, Member, IEEE Marie Sklodowska-Curie Award Committee, 2014 – 2016 and Chair of same Committee, 2017-2019.
- Ilan Ben-Zvi served on various national advisory committees: Member, National Academy of Sciences Committee for the Scientific Assessment of High-power Free-electron laser Technology, 2007-2008, member, High Energy Physics Advisory Panel, United States Department of Energy, 2013-2015.
- Ben-Zvi served on various international committees: Member, Advisory Committee on TRIUMF, National Research Council Canada, 2013-2015, chair of the FLASHForward Scientific Advisory Board,DESY 2014-2017 and member, DESY (Hamburg) Machine Advisory Committee, 2019-2020, and at Laboratori Nazionali di Legnaro on the International Advisory Committee on the APLI Positive Ion Injector, in 1996 as Chair and in 1997 as member, at Daresbury Laboratory as member, Cockcroft Institute Science Advisory Committee from 2006 to 2009.
- In 1996/1997, Ben-Zvi came up with the idea for the archival of accelerator conference proceedings on the World Wide Web, later to become known as JACoW, for Joint Accelerator Conferences Website. Ben-Zvi gathered representatives of the US, European and Asian particle accelerator conferences in a committee that launched JACoW. JACoW became a major community resource.

== Awards and honors ==
- 1994 – Fellow, American Physical Society
- 1999 – Institute of Electrical and Electronics Engineers Nuclear & Plasma Sciences Society Particle Accelerator Science and Technology Award
- 2001 – Brookhaven National Laboratory Science and Technology Award
- 2007 – Free-electron laser Prize, International Free Electron Laser Conference
- 2007 – Fellow, American Association for the Advancement of Science
- 2008 – Institute of Electrical and Electronics Engineers Nuclear & Plasma Sciences Society Merit Award
- 2008 – Institute of Electrical and Electronics Engineers Fellow
- 2022 – Institute of Electrical and Electronics Engineers Life Fellow
- 2023 - Dieter Möhl Medal "Dieter Möhl Awards 2023". Cool Conference 2023 (CERN).

== PhD Graduate students ==
- Qiu, Xu Joe (Ph.D. 1997, Studies of High Brightness Electron Beams at the ATF)
- Doyuran, Adnan (Ph.D. 2000, The High-Gain Harmonic Generation FEL Experiment)
- Xiangyun Chang (Ph.D. 2005, High-Power, High-Current Electron Guns)
- Rama Calaga (Ph.D. 2006, Linear Beam Dynamics and Ampere Class SRF Cavities @RHIC)
- Gang Wang (Ph.D.2008, Coherent Electron Cooling / Two Stream Instabilities Due to Cooling)
- Tianmu Xin (Ph.D. 2016, Electron Source based on Superconducting RF)
- Omer Habib (Ph.D. 2016, Funneling electron beams from GaAs photocathodes)
- Jyoti Biswas (Ph.D. 2020, Progress towards long-lifetime, high-current polarized-electron source)

== Master's Graduate students ==
Shi, Zudan; Wang, Haipeng; Babzien, Marcus; Kusche, Karl; Grimes, Jacob; Johnson, Elliott; Liang, Xue.

== Bibliography ==
=== Articles, editorial work and book chapters ===
- Full list of publication is available at ORCID https://orcid.org/0000-0001-5583-0106
- Ben-Zvi authored or co-authored over 650 articles, including over 170 articles in peer-reviewed journals.
- Ben-Zvi, I. Editor, UV Free-Electron Laser Preliminary Design Report. BNL NSLS Informal Report (2/93). [BNL-48565]
- Ben-Zvi, I., and Winick, H., Eds. Towards Short Wavelength Free-Electron Lasers. Proceedings of Towards Short Wavelengths FELS Workshop, May 21–22, 1993, Brookhaven National Laboratory, Upton NY. (1993). [BNL-49651]
- Ben-Zvi, I., and Krinsky, S., Guest editors, Proceedings of the Seventeenth International Free Electron Laser Conference, New York, NY, USA, August 21–25, 1995, North-Holland, Amsterdam, 1996, Nuclear Instruments and Methods in Physics Research A375.
- Ben-Zvi, I., Photoinjectors, in Accelerator Physics technology and Applications, A.W. Chao, H.O. Moserand Z. Zhao, Eds., World Scientific 2004, ISBN 981-238-794-3.
- Ben-Zvi, I., Photoinjectors, In Femtosecond Beam Science, M. Uesaka Ed., World Scientific 2005, ISBN 1-86094-343-8.

=== Selected articles ===
==== Original superconducting microwave cavities ====
- I. Ben-Zvi, P.H. Ceperley and H.A. Schwettman. The design of re-entrant cavities. Particle Accelerators 7, No.3 (1976).
- I. Ben-Zvi and J.M. Brennan. The quarter wave resonator as a superconducting linac element. Nuclear Instruments and Methods in Physics Research A212, 73 (1983).
- I. Ben-Zvi. A superconducting RFQ for an ECR injector. Particle Accelerators 23 No. 4, 265 (1988).
- Binping Xiao, Luís Alberty, Sergey Belomestnykh, Ilan Ben-Zvi, Rama Calaga, Chris Cullen, Ofelia Capatina, Lee Hammons, Zenghai Li, Carlos Marques, John Skaritka, Silvia Verdú-Andres, and Qiong Wu, Design, prototyping, and testing of a compact superconducting double quarter wave crab cavity, Phys. Rev. ST Accel. Beams 18, 041004 (2015)

==== Advanced beam instrumentation ====
- X. Qiu, K. Batchelor, I. Ben-Zvi and X.J. Wang, Demonstration of emittance compensation through the measurement of the slice emittance of a 10 picosecond electron bunch, Physical Review Letters 76 No. 20, 3723, (1996)
- M. Babzien, I. Ben-Zvi, R. Malone, X.-J. Wang, V. Yakimenko, Recent progress in emittance control of the photoelectron beam using transverse laser shape modulation and tomography technique, Proc. of the 1999 Particle Accelerator Conference, A. Luccio, W. MacKay, Editors, 2158, (1999)
- P. Catravas, W.P. Leemans, J.S. Wurtele, M.S. Zolotorev, M. Babzien, I. Ben-Zvi, Z. Segalov, X.J. Wang, V. Yakimenko, Measurement of Electron-Beam Bunch Length and Emittance Using Shot-Noise-Driven Fluctuations in Incoherent Radiation, Physical Review Letters 82 no. 26, 5261, (1999)

==== High brightness electron beams ====
- Wang, X. J., Qiu, X., & Ben-Zvi, I. (1996). Experimental observation of high-brightness microbunching in a photocathode rf electron gun. Physical Review E, 54(4), R3121.
- 12. I. Petrushina, V. N. Litvinenko, Y. Jing, J. Ma, I. Pinayev, K. Shih, G. Wang, Y. H. Wu, Z. Altinbas, J. C. Brutus, S. Belomestnykh, A. Di Lieto, P. Inacker, J. Jamilkowski, G. Mahler, M. Mapes, T. Miller, G. Narayan, M. Paniccia, T. Roser, F. Severino, J. Skaritka, L. Smart, K. Smith, V. Soria, Y. Than, J. Tuozzolo, E. Wang, B. Xiao, T. Xin, I. Ben-Zvi, C. Boulware, T. Grimm, K. Mihara, D. Kayran, and T. Rao, High-Brightness Continuous-Wave Electron Beams from Superconducting Radio-Frequency Photoemission Gun, Phys. Rev. Lett. 124, 244801, (2020)

==== Electron sources ====
- E. Wang, V. N. Litvinenko, I. Pinayev, M. Gaowei, J. Skaritka, S. Belomestnykh, I. Ben-Zvi, J. C. Brutus, Y. Jing, J. Biswas, J. Ma, G. Narayan, I. Petrushina, O. Rahman, T. Xin, T. Rao, F. Severino, K. Shih, K. Smith, G. Wang & Y. Wu, Long lifetime of bialkali photocathodes operating in high gradient Superconducting Radio Frequency gun, Nature, Scientific Reports 11, Article number: 4477 (2021)
- Erdong Wang, Ilan Ben-Zvi, Triveni Rao, D.A. Dimitrov, Xiangyun Chang, Qiong Wu, Tianmu Xin, Secondary-electron emission from hydrogen-terminated diamond: Experiments and model, Phys. Rev. ST Accel. Beams 14, 111301 (2011)
- Omer Rahman, Erdong Wang, Ilan Ben-Zvi, et al. Increasing charge lifetime in dc polarized electron guns by offsetting the anode, Phys. Rev. Accel. Beams 22, 083401 (2019)

==== Laser based acceleration and radiation ====
- Pogorelsky, I. V., Ben-Zvi, I., Hirose, T., Kashiwagi, S., Yakimenko, V., Kusche, K., ... & Cline, D. (2000). Demonstration of 8x10^{18} photons/second peaked at 1.8 Å in a relativistic Thomson scattering experiment. Physical Review Special Topics-Accelerators and Beams, 3(9), 090702.
- W. D. Kimura, A. van Steenbergen, M. Babzien, I. Ben-Zvi, L. P. Campbell, D. B. Cline, C. E. Dilley, J. C. Gallardo, S. C. Gottschalk, P. He, K. P. Kusche, Y. Liu, R. H. Pantell, I. V. Pogorelsky, D. C. Quimby, J. Skaritka, L. C. Steinhauer, and V. Yakimenko, First Staging of Two Laser Accelerators, Physical Review Letters 86 no. 18, 4041 (2001)

==== Free-Electron Lasers ====
- I. Ben-Zvi, K.M. Yang and L.H. Yu, The ‘Fresh-Bunch’ Technique in FELs, Nuclear Instruments & Methods in Physics Research A318, 726 (1992). BNL 46688.
- Yu, L. H., Babzien, M., Ben-Zvi, I., DiMauro, L. F., Doyuran, A., Graves, W., ... & Vasserman, I. (2000). High-gain harmonic-generation free-electron laser. Science, 289(5481), 932–934.
- Nuhn, H. D. (2002). Linac Coherent Light Source (LCLS) Conceptual Design Report (No. SLAC-R-593). SLAC National Accelerator Lab., Menlo Park, CA (United States).

==== Accelerators and Colliders ====
- Ben-Zvi, I. Kewisch, J. Murphy and S. Peggs, Accelerator Physics Issues in eRHIC, Nuclear Instruments and Methods in Physics Research A463, 94 (2001), C-A/AP/14.
- Fernandez, J. A., Adolphsen, C., Akay, A. N., Aksakal, H., Albacete, J. L., Alekhin, S., ... & Sultansoy, S. (2012). A large hadron electron collider at CERN report on the physics and design concepts for machine and detector. Journal of Physics G: Nuclear and Particle Physics, 39(7), 075001.

==== Electron cooling ====
- I. Ben-Zvi, High-Current ERL-Based Electron Cooling System for RHIC, Proceedings, International Cooling Workshop, Galena, IL, September 18–23, 2005. AIP Conference Proceedings, 821, pp. 75–84, 2006
- A.V. Fedotov et al, Experimental Demonstration of Hadron Beam Cooling Using Radio-Frequency Accelerated Electron Bunches. Physical Review Letters 124, 084801 (2020)

==== Multipacting ====
- I. Ben-Zvi, J.F. Crawford and J.P. Turneaure, Electron multiplication in cavities. IEEE Trans. Nucl. Sci. NS-20, 8, 54 (1973).
- Damayanti Naik and Ilan Ben-Zvi, Suppressing multipacting in a 56 MHz quarter wave resonator, Physical Review Special Topics-Accelerators and Beams 13, 052001 (2010)

==== Cryogenics ====
- I. Ben-Zvi, B.V. Elkonin, J.S. Sokolowski and D. Sellmann. Current leads for HERA. Nuclear Instruments and Methods in Physics Research A276, 53, (1989)
- I. Ben-Zvi, B.V. Elkonin, J.S. Sokolowski and N. Pundak. Large diameter horizontal helium cryostats. Cryogenics 21, 213 (1981).

==== Control of accelerator cavities ====
- G. Bassato, R. Ponchia and I. Ben-Zvi, A microprocessor based controller for superconducting resonators. Proc. Fourth Workshop on rf Superconductivity, KEK Tsukuba, Japan p. 467 (1989).
- I. Ben-Zvi, J. Xie and R. Zhang, Feed Forward RF Control System of the Accelerator Test Facility, Proceedings 1991 Particle Accelerator Conference, IEEE 91CH3038-7 p. 1323.
- SRF Cavity Testing with a Self-Excited Loop”, May 2018, CERN-ACC-Note-20180039

==== Ferroelectric tuners and phase shifters ====
- Ilan Ben-Zvi, Graeme Burt, Alejandro Castilla, Alick Macpherson, and Nicholas Shipman, Conceptual design of a high reactive-power ferroelectric fast reactive tuner, Physical Review Accelerators and Beams 27, 052001 (2024)
- Ilan Ben-Zvi , Alick Macpherson and Samuel Smith, Detailed design and optimization of ferroelectric tuners, PHYSICAL REVIEW ACCELERATORS AND BEAMS 28, 093502 (2025)
- Ilan Ben-Zvi and Nicholas Shipman, High Power Fast Frequency Modulation, arXiv:2502.13312v1 [physics.acc-ph] 18 Feb 2025
