= ATF (disambiguation) =

The Bureau of Alcohol, Tobacco, Firearms and Explosives is a federal law enforcement organization within the US Department of Justice.

ATF may also refer to:

== Organizations ==
- American Type Founders, former dominant American manufacturer of metal type
- Anti-Terrorism Squad, counterterrorism units of police departments in India
- As Trustee For, a legal term for an entity acting as a trustee; see Trust law
- Asia Task Force, a committee of UK businesses, informing the UK response to globalisation
- Asian Tennis Federation, a continental body of national tennis associations of Asian countries
- Atlantic Theatre Festival, a professional theatre company located in Wolfville, Nova Scotia, Canada

== Places ==
- French Southern and Antarctic Lands (ISO 3166 country code)
- Chachoan Airport (IATA code), Ambato, Ecuador

== Science and technology ==
- Anatomical transfer function, the mathematical description of sound wave propagation through the human body
- Activating transcription factor, a class of DNA-binding proteins that regulate gene transcription
  - Activating transcription factor 2, such a factor encoded by the ATF2 gene in humans
- Artificial transcription factor, a type of engineered protein used in gene modulation
- Automatic transmission fluid, the liquid medium used in hydraulic automatic transmission systems
- Automated Telescope Facility, a robotic telescope built by the University of Iowa
- Aviation turbine fuel, for jet aircraft
- ARM Trusted Firmware, also TF-A, a reference open-source firmware for ARM architecture CPUs aiming at boot-up integrity

== Music ==
- After the Fire, a 1970s and 1980s rock band
- Around the Fur, an album by American rock band Deftones
- "ATF", a song on the album Feeler by The Toadies
- "ATF", a rap song on the album It's Dark and Hell Is Hot by DMX

== Military ==
- Advanced Tactical Fighter, a program undertaken by the United States Air Force to develop a next-generation air superiority fighter
- A US Navy hull classification symbol: Fleet ocean tug (ATF)
- ATF Dingo, a German heavily armored military infantry mobility vehicle
- 1 ATF, the 1st Australian Task Force, which commanded Australian and New Zealand's troops in the Vietnam War

== Other uses ==
- A.T.F., a 1999 television film produced for the American Broadcasting Company
- ATF (video game), a computer game released by Digital Integration
- Acquire the Fire, a Christian youth conference series run by Teen Mania Ministries
- About The Fit, a fictional startup in the film The Intern (2015 film)

== See also ==
- Accelerator Test Facility (disambiguation)
