= National User Facility =

The National User Facilities are a set of large-scale scientific facilities maintained by the U.S. Department of Energy, Office of Science, whose roles are to provide the scientific community with world-leading scientific instruments to enable research. These facilities are generally free to use, and are open to scientists from all over the world, usually through the submission and evaluation of research proposals.

As of 2020, there are 26 such facilities.

== Light sources ==
The light sources are synchrotron or x-ray free electron laser facilities that provide users with x-ray beams for a variety of scattering, spectroscopy, and imaging experiments. These facilities accommodate tens of beamlines running in parallel. Their 2000–5000 users per facility perform experiments each year.

- Advanced Light Source (ALS)
- Advanced Photon Source (APS)
- National Synchrotron Light Source II (NSLS-II)
- Stanford Synchrotron Radiation Light source (SSRL)
- Linac Coherent Light Source (LCLS)

== Neutron sources ==
The neutron sources are spallation sources or reactors that provides users with neutron beams for a variety of experiments.

- Spallation Neutron Source (SNS)
- High flux Isotope Reactor (HFIR)

== Super computers ==
The super-computing facilities are made available to the users to perform high intensity calculations. As of November 2019, four of the top ten super computers worldwide were hosted by a national user facility ( Summit, Sierra, Trinity and Lassen.)

- Oak Ridge Leadership Computing Facility (OLCF)
- Argonne Leadership Computing Facility (ALCF)
- National Energy Research Scientific Computing Center (NERSC)
- Energy Sciences Network (ESnet)

== High Energy Physics ==
- Fermilab Accelerator Complex
- Argonne Tandem Linac Accelerator System (ATLAS)
- High Flux Isotope Reactor (HFIR)
- National Spherical Torus Experiment – Upgrade (NSTX-U)
- Relativistic Heavy Ion Collider (RHIC)
- DIII-D National Fusion Facility (DIII-D)

== Material science ==
- Center for Integrated Nanotechnologies (CINT)
- Center for Functional Nanomaterials (CFN)
- Environmental Molecular Sciences Laboratory (EMSL)
- Center for Nanophase Materials Sciences (CNMS)
- The Molecular Foundry (TMF)
- Center for Nanoscale Materials (CNM)

== Biology and environment ==
- Joint Genome Institute (JGI)
- Atmospheric Radiation Measurement Climate Research Facility (ARM)

== Test facilities ==
- Continuous Electron Beam Accelerator Facility (CEBAF)
- Facility for Advanced Accelerator Experimental Tests (FACET)
- Accelerator Test Facility (ATF)
