= Perlmutter (supercomputer) =

US Department of Energy supercomputer

- Active: From 2021
- Sponsors: United States Department of Energy
- Operators: Lawrence Berkeley National Laboratory
- Location: National Energy Research Scientific Computing Center
- Architecture: Nvidia A100 GPUs, AMD Milan CPU
- Operating system: Custom Linux-based kernel
- Memory: 256 GiB/node
- Storage: 35 PB, 5 TB/s Shared all-flash Lustre Filesystem
- Purpose: Nuclear fusion simulations, climate projections, material and biological research and computational cosmology
- Website: www.nersc.gov/systems/perlmutter/

Perlmutter (also known as NERSC-9) is a supercomputer delivered to the National Energy Research Scientific Computing Center of the United States Department of Energy as the successor to Cori. It is being built by Cray and is based on their Shasta architecture which utilizes Zen 3 based AMD Epyc CPUs ("Milan") and Nvidia Ampere GPUs. Its intended use-cases are nuclear fusion simulations, climate projections, and material and biological research. Phase 1, completed May 27, 2022, reached 70.9 PFLOPS of processing power.

It is named in honor of Nobel prize winner Saul Perlmutter.
