= Shyh Wang Hall =

Building in University of California

Coordinates: 37.876153°N 122.25304°W

Shyh Wang Hall（王适大楼), or Wang Hall, is a building on the University of California, Berkeley campus. Located in the Berkeley Hills, it houses supercomputers designed to process 2 quadrillion calculations per second each. It is in the building complex of the Lawrence Berkeley National Laboratory. It was designed by Perkins&Will of San Francisco and opened in November 2015. It houses the National Energy Research Scientific Computing Center.
