= National Alliance for Water Innovation =

The National Alliance for Water Innovation (NAWI), is a broad U.S. national consortium established to design and carry out the research and development program needed to secure an affordable, energy-efficient, and resilient water supply for the US economy through decentralized, fit-for-purpose desalination. NAWI was founded in 2019 as one of five (DOE) Energy Innovation Hubs, and its principal support of $100M over five years has been provided by the U.S. Department of Energy's Office of Energy Efficiency and Renewable Energy.

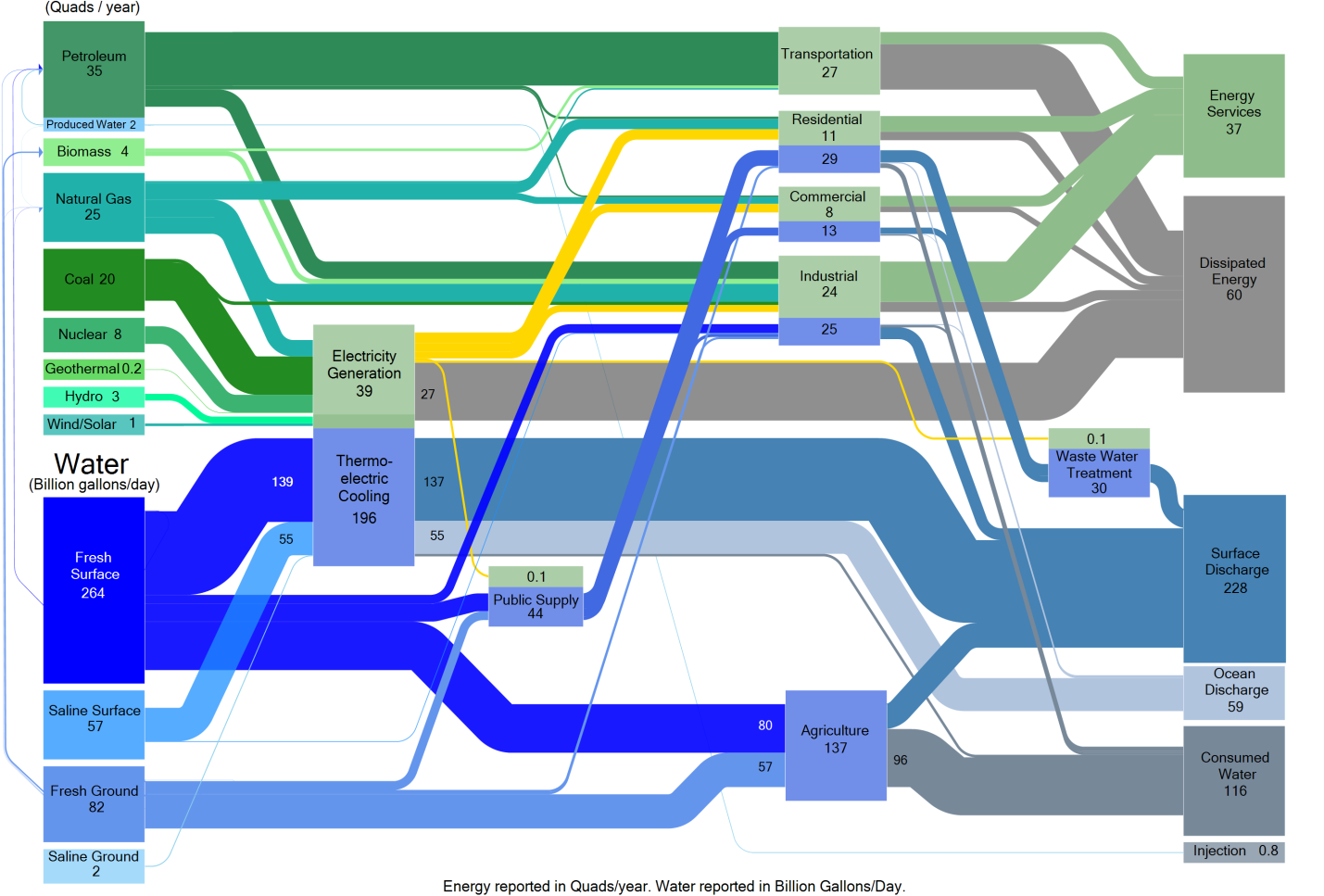
Hybrid Sankey diagram of 2011 U.S. interconnected water and energy flows

The NAWI hub is part of the DOE's Water-Energy Nexus initiative, which is described in a 2014 report that discusses the close connections between the national challenges in energy and water. The Sankey diagram of interconnected water and energy flows comes from that report.

NAWI is headquartered at Lawrence Berkeley National Laboratory (Berkeley Lab), and was co-founded by Berkeley Lab, Oak Ridge National Laboratory (ORNL), and the National Renewable Energy Laboratory (NREL). The industry partners for NAWI are ExxonMobil, Global Water Innovations, Inc., and Poseidon Water. The NAWI consortium has 100 members from the industry, academic, and government sectors, and work with eight water research facilities around the country. The executive director of NAWI is Peter Fiske of Berkeley Lab, and the Research Director is Meagan S. Mauter of Stanford University.

The NAWI organization identifies research and development opportunities designed to advance desalination and treatment of nontraditional source waters for beneficial use in public water supplies. A 2020 opinion article in a scientific journal by Fiske and Mauter makes the case for establishing NAWI. From the abstract:

Our linear water economy must evolve into a resilient circular water economy, where water is continuously reused and 'contaminants' become the feedstocks for other economically valuable processes. Technology innovation is needed to deliver autonomous, precise, resilient, intensified, modular, and electrified desalination systems that reduce the cost, improve the performance, and enhance the resilience of nontraditional water reuse systems.

The first action taken by NAWI was to develop and publish a master roadmap and technology baselines for eight categories of nontraditional waters, which were published in a special journal issue. The eight categories of nontraditional waters are:

- Seawater and ocean water
- Brackish groundwater
- Industrial wastewater
- Municipal wastewater
- Agricultural wastewater
- Mining wastewater
- Produced water
- Power and cooling wastewater.

The master roadmap and the five end-use sector roadmaps are available on the NAWI website. The five end-use sectors are power, resource extraction, industrial, municipal, and agriculture. All NAWI publications are conveniently collected on a Google scholar page.
