= Bruce Carlsten =

Bruce Eric Carlsten
- Born: June 1, 1958 (age 67)
- Known for: Beam physics
- Scientific career
- Institutions: Stanford University, Los Alamos National Laboratory

Bruce Carlsten is a senior research and development engineer at the Los Alamos National Laboratory (LANL).

In 1985 Carlsten received his PhD from Stanford University following a BS from UCLA in 1979, then was a Fellow of the IEEE, the American Physical Society, and the Los Alamos National Laboratory.

He was the leader of the High-Power Electrodynamics group at LANL From 2005 to 2012. In this role he oversaw this group's projects researching free-electron lasers, high-power and high-frequency microwave sources and effects, and accelerator components. then became the chief scientist for LANL's Navy-funded Free Electron Laser oscillator project and is director of design at the Laboratory's future X-ray Free Electron Laser, the MaRIE (Matter-Radiation Interactions in Extremes) facility.

In 2016 Carlsten was named a fellow of the Institute of Electrical and Electronics Engineers (IEEE) for his contributions to the development of high-brightness electron beams and vacuum electron devices. In 2020, he will receive the American Physical Society's Division of the Physics of Beams' Wilson Prize.
