= Joint BioEnergy Institute =

Research institute in Emeryville, California

Coordinates: 37°50′26″N 122°17′23″W

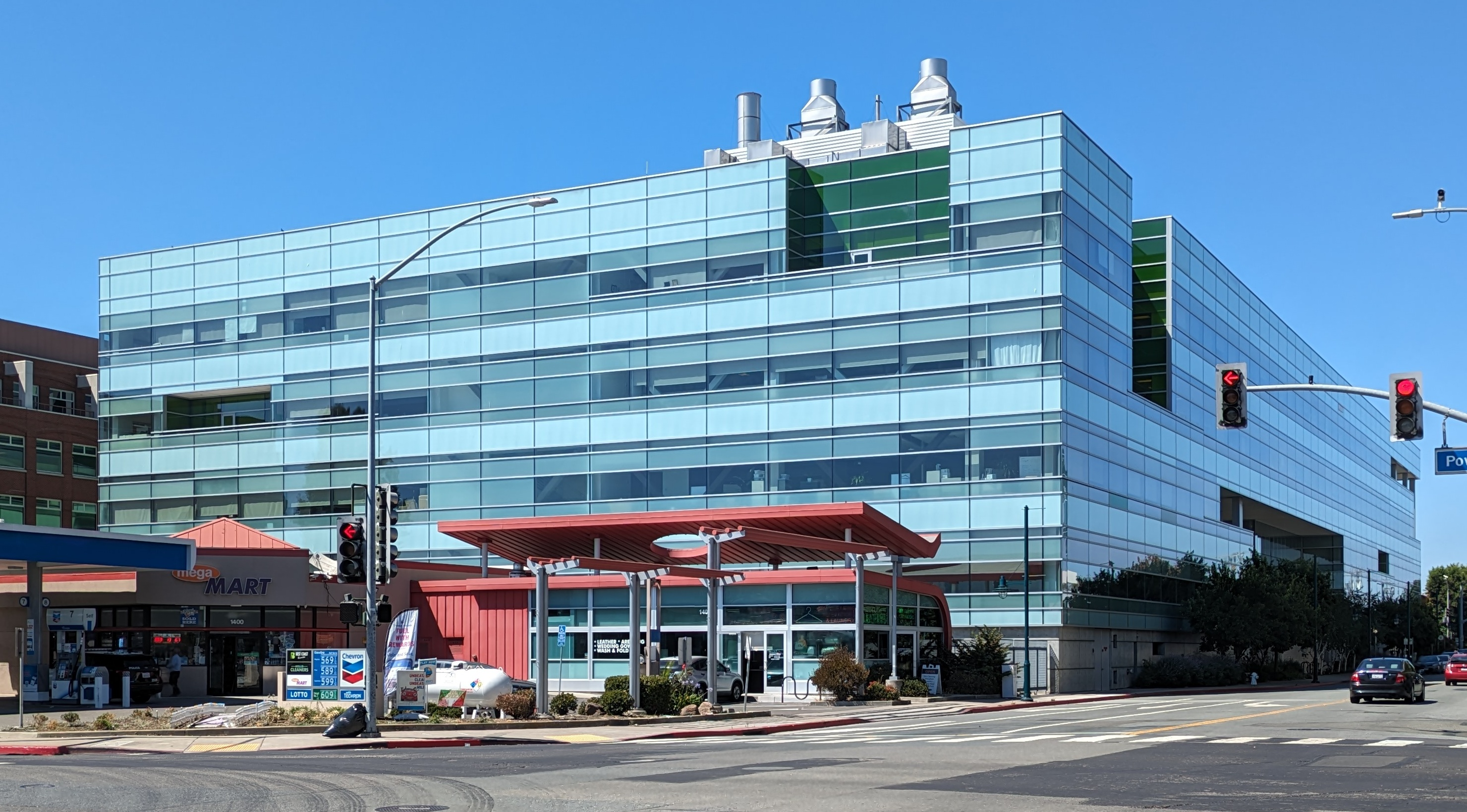
JBEI's location at 5885 Hollis Street, Emeryville

The Joint BioEnergy Institute (JBEI) is a research institute funded by the United States Department of Energy. JBEI is led by the Lawrence Berkeley National Laboratory, and includes participation from the Sandia National Laboratory, Lawrence Livermore National Laboratory, as well as UC Berkeley, UC Davis, Iowa State University, and the Carnegie Institute. JBEI is located in Emeryville, California.

The goal of The Joint BioEnergy Institute is to develop biofuels, bio-synthesized from lignin derived from corn stover, sorghum and other plant feedstocks (see second generation biofuels) as an alternative to fossil fuels. Additionally, there are efforts to produce bio-based chemicals derived from the deconstruction of lignocellulosic biomass to create bio-based polymers and other commodities such as perfumes, dietary supplements as well as other high-end products. The goal is to use these bio-based chemicals to help finance the change in infrastructure from petroleum fuels to biofuels.

JBEI functions as an incubator for scientific discovery bringing together the best researchers from around the country and the globe.

Inside JBEI's Emeryville laboratories, five interlocking scientific divisions–Life-cycle, Economics and Agronomy; Feedstocks; Deconstruction; Biofuels and Bioproducts; and Technology–bring the sunlight-to-biofuels/bioproducts pipeline under one roof.

JBEI represents a departure from traditional research institutions that specialize in a single field. Here, an inter-disciplinary team of some 160-plus scientists, post doctoral researchers and graduate students combine their expertise and collaborate to develop genetic, biological, computational and robotic technologies to accelerate the process of discovery.

JBEI researchers are developing scientific breakthroughs to produce clean, sustainable, carbon-neutral biofuels and bioproducts.

An inter-disciplinary team of scientists is using the latest techniques in molecular biology, chemical and genetic engineering to develop new biological systems, processes and technologies to convert biomass to biofuels and bioproducts.

In the lab, JBEI researchers are engineering microbes to transform sugars into energy-rich fuels that can directly replace petroleum-derived gasoline, diesel, and jet fuel. Advanced biofuels can also be dropped into today's engines and infrastructures with no loss of performance.

Harnessing the solar energy in biomass from grasses and other non-edible plants could meet much of the nation's annual transportation energy needs without contributing to global climate change.
