= National Energy Research Scientific Computing Center =

Supercomputer facility operated by the US Department of Energy in Berkeley, California

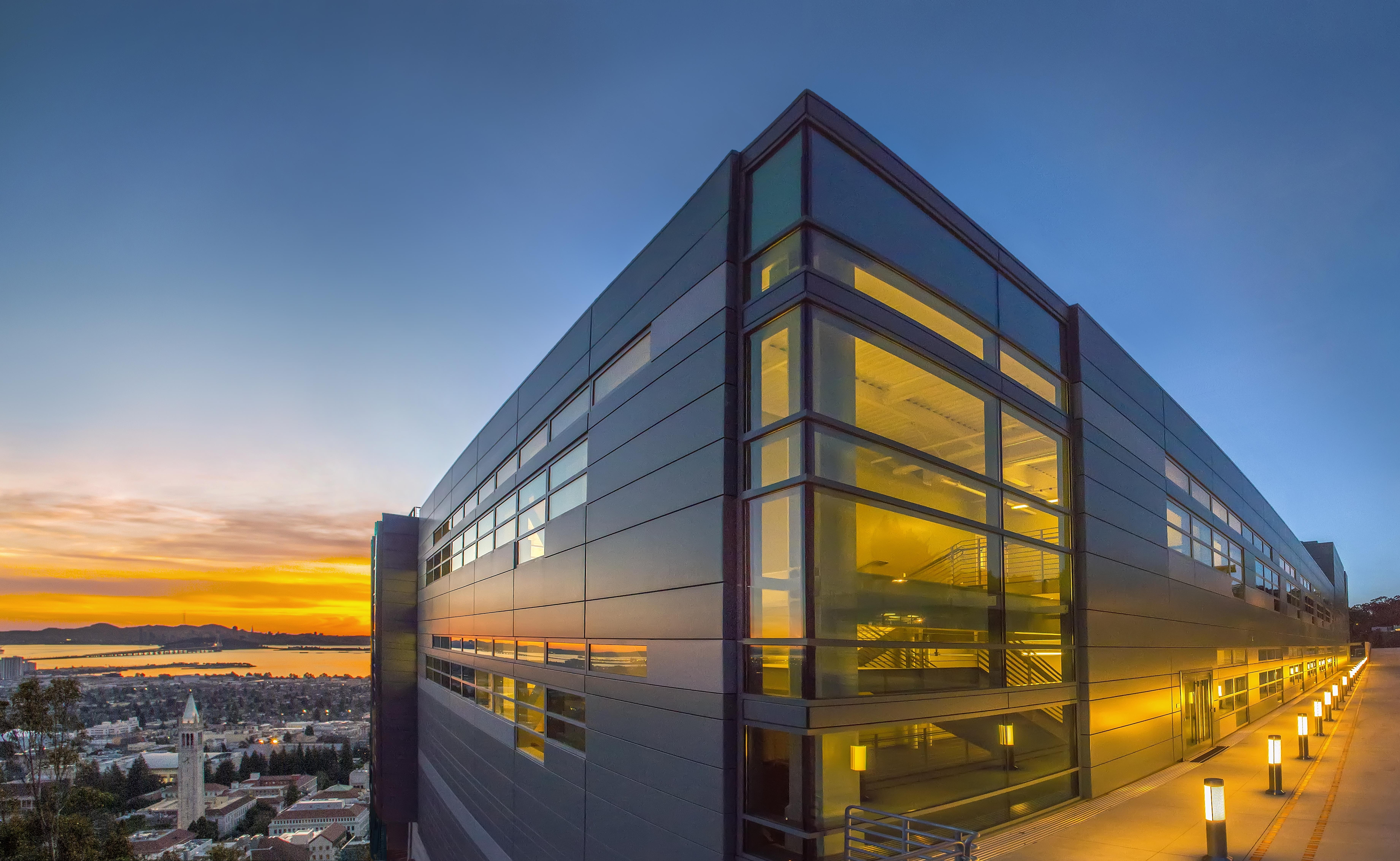
Shyh Wang Hall, houses the National Energy Research Scientific Computing Center at Lawrence Berkeley National Laboratory.

The National Energy Research Scientific Computing Center (NERSC) is a high-performance computing (supercomputer) research facility that was founded in 1974. The National User Facility is operated by Lawrence Berkeley National Laboratory for the United States Department of Energy Office of Science.

== Mission ==
NERSC's mission is to provide high performance computing and data analysis expertise and resources in support of Office of Science research. NERSC supports more than 10,000 scientists from national laboratories and universities across the country and is cited in more than 2,500 refereed scientific publications each year. Research at NERSC is focused on fundamental and applied research with energy efficiency, storage, generation, and Earth systems science, understanding of fundamental forces of nature, and the Universe. The largest research areas are High Energy Physics, Materials Science, Chemical Sciences, Climate and Environmental Sciences, Nuclear Physics, and Fusion Energy research.

== History ==
NERSC was founded in 1974 as the Controlled Thermonuclear Research Computer Center, or CTRCC, at Lawrence Livermore National Laboratory (LLNL). The center was created to provide computing resources to the fusion energy research community and began with a Control Data Corporation 6600 computer (SN-1). The first machine procured directly by the center was a CDC 7600, installed in 1975 with a peak performance of 36 megaflop/s (36 million floating point operations per second). In 1976, the center was renamed the National Magnetic Fusion Energy Computer Center.

Subsequent supercomputers include a Cray-1 (SN-6), which was installed in May 1978 and called the "c" machine. In 1985, the world's first Cray-2 (SN-1) was installed as the "b" machine. The bubbles visible in the fluid of the Cray-2's direct liquid cooling system earned it the nickname "Bubbles."

In 1983, the center began providing a small portion of its resources to researchers outside the fusion community. As the center increasingly supported science across many research areas, it changed its name to the National Energy Research Supercomputer Center in 1990.

In 1995, the Department of Energy (DOE) moved NERSC from the Lawrence Livermore National Laboratory to Lawrence Berkeley National Laboratory. A cluster of Cray J90 systems was installed in Berkeley before the main systems at Livermore were shut down for the move in 1996 to provide continuous support for the research community. As a part of the move, the center was renamed the National Energy Research Scientific Computing Center, but kept the NERSC acronym. In 2000, NERSC moved to a new site in Oakland to accommodate the growing footprint of air-cooled supercomputers.

In November 2015, NERSC moved back to the main Berkeley Lab site and is housed in Shyh Wang Hall, an energy-efficient supercomputer facility. The building was financed by the University of California which manages Berkeley Lab for the U.S. Department of Energy (DOE). As with the move from LLNL, a new system was first installed in Berkeley before the machines in Oakland were taken down and moved. The utility infrastructure and computer systems are provided by the DOE.

== Computers ==
The center names its major systems after scientists.

The newest supercomputer Perlmutter, is named after Saul Perlmutter, an astrophysicist at Berkeley Lab who shared the 2011 Nobel Prize in Physics for his contributions to research showing that the expansion of the universe is accelerating. It is a Cray system based on the Shasta architecture, with Zen 3 based AMD Epyc CPUs ("Milan") and NVIDIA Ampere GPUs. Perlmutter debuted in 2021 and is ranked 5th on the TOP500 list of world's fastest supercomputers. The upcoming supercomputer is named after Jennifer Doudna, co-recipient of the 2020 Nobel Prize in Chemistry.

NERSC's previous flagship supercomputer was Cori, named after Gerty Cori, a biochemist who was the first American woman to receive a Nobel Prize in science. Cori was a Cray XC40 system with 622,336 Intel processor cores and a theoretical peak performance of 30 petaflop/s (30 quadrillion operations per second). Cori was delivered in two phases. The first phase—also known as the Data Partition—was installed in late 2015 and comprised 12 cabinets and more than 1,600 Intel Xeon "Haswell" compute nodes. The second phase of Cori, installed in summer 2016, added 52 cabinets and more than 9,300 nodes with second-generation Intel Xeon Phi processors (code-named Knights Landing, or KNL for short), making Cori in its day the largest supercomputing system for open science based on KNL processors.

NERSC also houses a 200+ petabyte High Performance Storage System (HPSS) for archival mass storage, in use since 1998.

NERSC facilities are accessible through the Energy Sciences Network, or ESnet, which is also managed by Lawrence Berkeley National Laboratory for the Department of Energy.

== Projects ==
NERSC staff lead projects in computational science while also helping prepare the broader research community for the exascale era.

NESAP: The NERSC Exascale Science Applications Program partners with code teams and library and tool developers to prepare applications to use Cori's manycore architecture. Researchers prepare application codes for the new architecture. The NESAP partnership allows 20 projects to collaborate with NERSC, Cray, and Intel by providing access to early hardware, training, and preparation sessions with Intel and Cray staff. Eight of those 20 projects will also have an opportunity for a postdoctoral researcher to investigate computational science issues associated with energy-efficient many-core systems.

Shifter: Shifter is an open-source software tool based on Docker containers that enables NERSC users to analyze datasets from experimental facilities. Such containers allow an application to be packaged with its entire software stack—including some portions of the base OS files—as well as defining user environment variables and application "entry point".

HPC4Mfg (High Performance Computing for Manufacturing): NERSC is one of three DOE supercomputing centers working to create an ecosystem that allows experts at national laboratories to work directly with manufacturing industry members to teach them how to adopt or advance their use of high performance computing (HPC) to address manufacturing challenges with a goal of increasing energy efficiency, reducing environmental impacts and advancing clean energy technologies. The project is led by Lawrence Livermore National Laboratory.

== NERSC's user community and scientific impact ==
In 2021 NERSC was acknowledged in more than 2,000 referenced scientific journal publications. Six Nobel Prize winning individuals or teams have used NERSC in their research.

In 2022, NERSC supported nearly 9,000 users from universities, national labs, and industries and has users in 50 US states, the District of Columbia, Puerto Rico, and 45 countries. NERSC supported researchers from 514 colleges and universities, 26 Department of Energy National Laboratories, 52 organizations in industry, 31 small businesses, 115 other government labs, and 19 non-profit organizations.
