= ELETTRA =

Italian-based research center

Coordinates: 45°38′42.6″N 13°50′55.2″E

Elettra Sincrotrone Trieste is an international research center opened in operation since October 1993 which is located in Basovizza on the outskirts of Trieste, Italy.

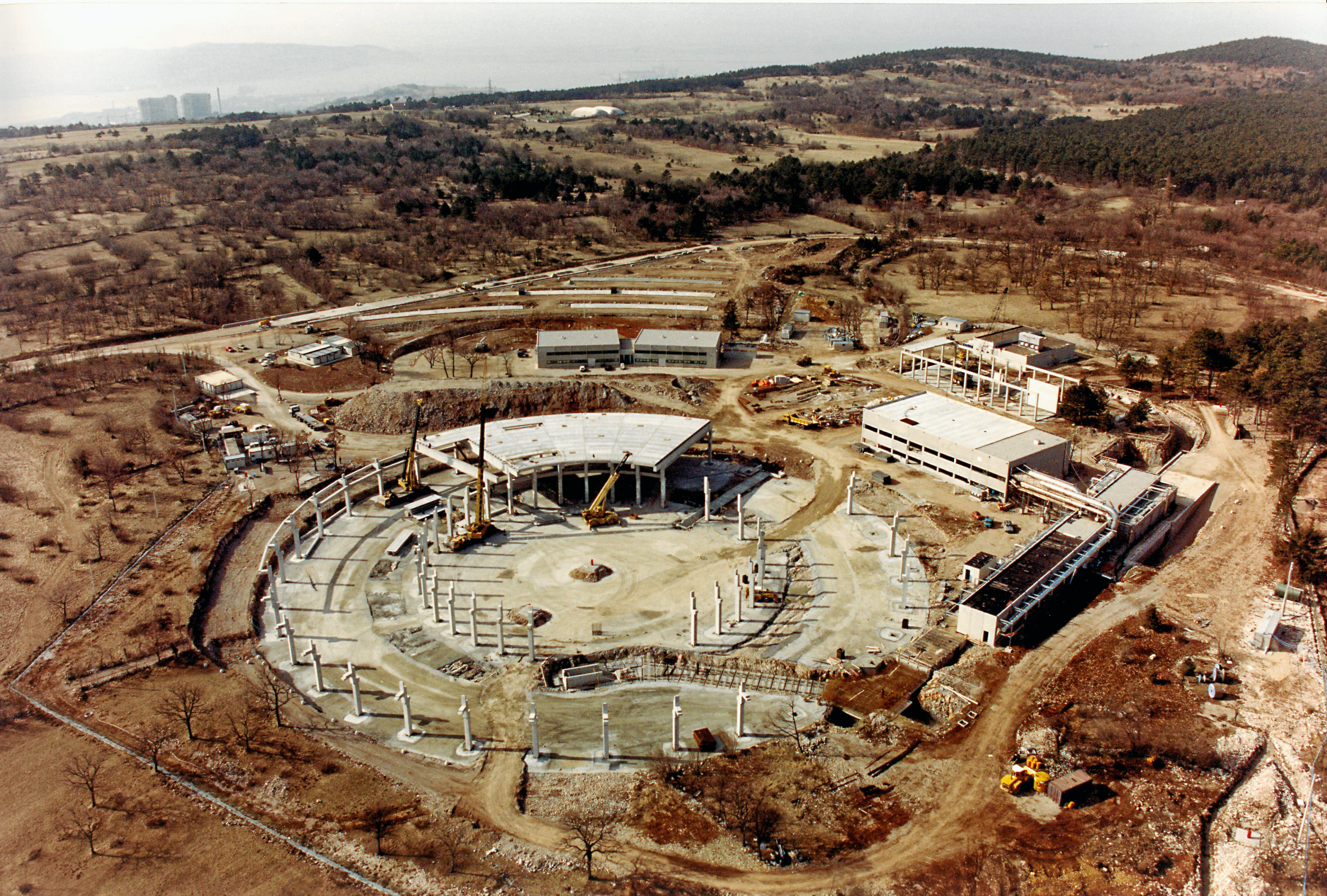
Elettra synchrotron under construction

Elettra – Sincrotrone Trieste S.C.p.A. is a multidisciplinary international research center, specialized in generating high quality synchrotron and free-electron laser light and applying it in materials science. Its mission is to promote cultural, social and economic growth through:

- Basic and applied research
- Technical and scientific training
- Transfer of technology and know-how

The main assets of the research centre are two advanced light sources: the Elettra synchrotron (third generation electron storage ring, working at 2 and 2.4 GeV) and the free-electron laser (FEL) FERMI, continuously operated supplying light of the selected energy and quality to more than 30 experimental stations on 28 beamlines. Since 1993, Elettra has been subjected to several updates that have allowed a top up operating mode from 2010 for both 2 and 2.4 GeV operational energy. The accumulation ring is formed by twelve groups of magnets forming a ring of 260 m in circumference. The ring beam current at 2 GeV is normally set to 310 mA and the top-up operational mode foresees a new ring injection every 6 min: 1 mA electron in 4 seconds is injected, keeping the ring current constant in the range of 3‰. At 2.4 GeV the beam current is set to 140 mA, and the top-up injections occurs every 20 minutes: in this case, 1 mA electron in 4 s is injected keeping the current level constant to 7‰. At the actual condition, the spectral brightness available on most beamlines is up to 10^{19} photons/s/mm^{2}/mrad^{2}/0.1%bw.

The FERMI FEL works in an SRHG method, operating at 2 GeV and producing coherent femtosecond light pulses with variable polarization, in an ultraviolet energy range. The produced optical pulses are characterized by a High peak power (~ GW) delivered to 8 different beamlines. The peak brightness of the FEL sources is expected to go up to 10^{30} photons/s/mm^{2}/mrad^{2}/0.1%bw.

The facilities allow researchers from academia and industry to characterize material properties and functions with sensitivity down to molecular and atomic levels, to pattern and nanofabricate new structures and devices, and to develop new processes. Scientists and engineers from more than 50 countries submit proposals to access and use time on these stations. Panels of international experts review the proposals on the basis of scientific merit and potential impact, and the winners are granted access time. Because of its central location in Europe, Elettra is increasingly attracting users from Central and Eastern European countries, where the demand for synchrotron radiation is in continuous growth, and is part of the primary network for science and technology of the Central European Initiative (CEI). The access by researchers from developing countries has risen significantly, and the Indian research community is one of the largest users.

Elettra has been the coordinator of the EU-supported networks involving synchrotron and free electron lasers in the European area which promote transnational access, joint research activities and collaborations among the laboratories to improve the overall service offered to European users.

The facility houses several ultra bright light sources, which use the synchrotron and free electron laser (FEL) sources to produce light ranging from ultraviolet to X-rays.

The centre also houses the European Storage Ring FEL Project (EUFELE).

== See also ==
- Signorina Elettra is a recurring fictional character in Donna Leon's Commissario Guido Brunetti novels
