= Accelerator Test Facility =

Accelerator Test Facility may refer to:

- Accelerator Test Facility (Japan) (KEK-ATF)
- Accelerator Test Facility (New York) (BNL-ATF), US
