= John Madey =

- Born: February 28, 1943; Elizabeth, New Jersey, U.S.
- Died: July 5, 2016 (aged 73); Honolulu, Hawaii, U.S.
- Citizenship: U.S.
- Education: California Institute of Technology; Stanford University
- Known for: Free-electron laser
- Awards: Stuart Ballantine Medal(1989); Robert R. Wilson Prize for Achievement in the Physics of Particle Accelerators (2012); Willis Lamb Award (2016)
- Scientific career
- Fields: Physics
- Workplaces: Stanford University; Duke University; University of Hawaiʻi at Mānoa

Signature
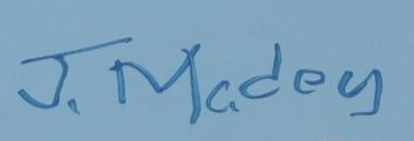

John M. J. Madey (28 February 1943 - 5 July 2016) was a professor of physics at the University of Hawaiʻi at Mānoa, a former director of the Free Electron Laser Laboratory at Duke University, and formerly a professor (research) at Stanford University. He is best known for his development of the free-electron laser (FEL) at Stanford University in the 1970s.

Raised in Clark, New Jersey, Madey and his older brother Jules took an early interest in ham radio. In 1956, when John was 13 and Jules was 16, they began relaying communications from the south pole to families and friends in the United States. While an undergraduate at the California Institute of Technology, he had a discussion where the question came up as to whether or not it was possible to enhance the transition rate for bremsstrahlung through stimulated emission. Madey received a BS degree in physics and a MS degree in Quantum Electronics from the California Institute of Technology in 1964 and 1965. He continued thinking about the stimulated emission question while working on his doctoral degree at Stanford, when he invented the free-electron laser. He was awarded a PhD in 1970, and appointed as Professor (Research) of Electrical Engineering in 1986.

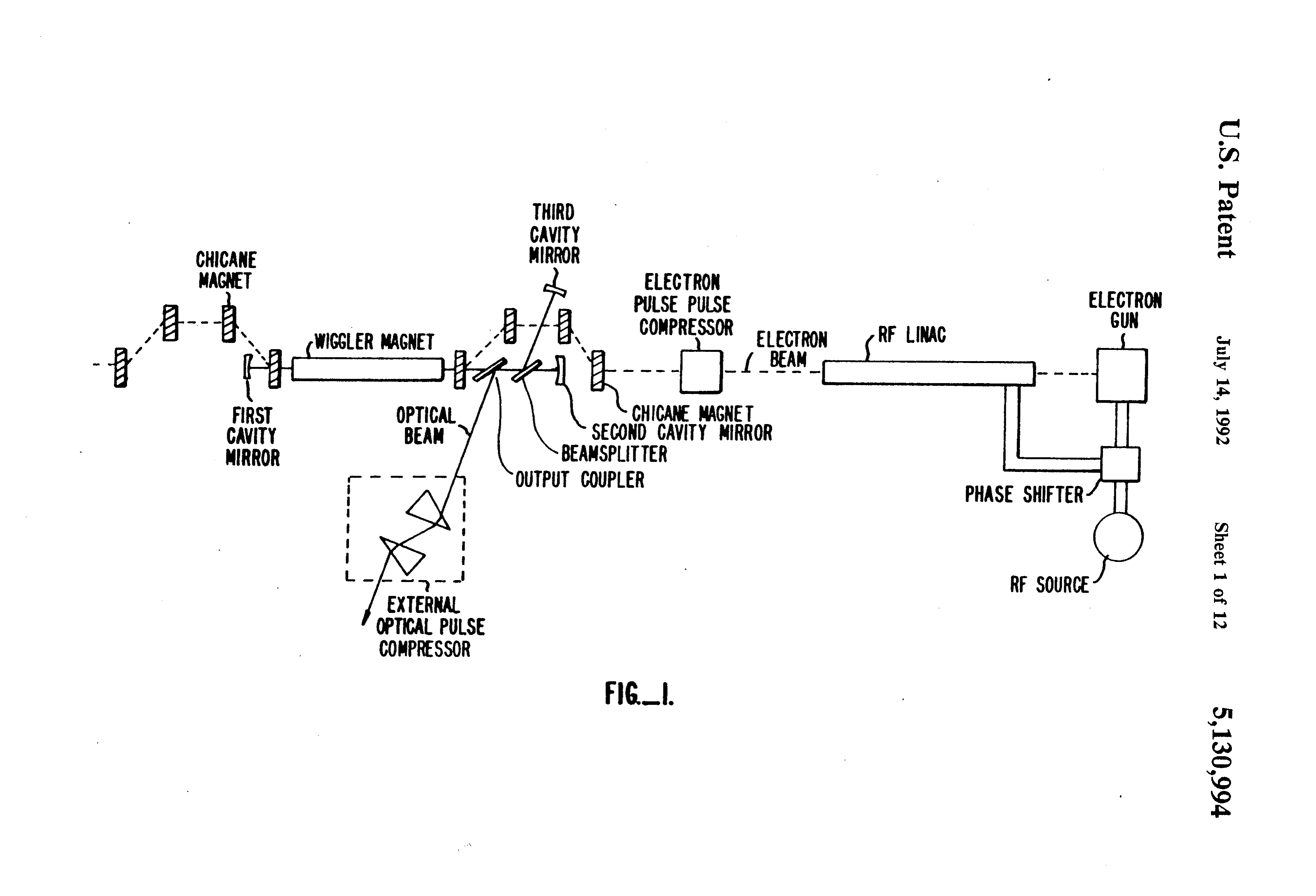
Madey's free-electron laser patent (US 5130994), filed June 25, 1991, issued July 14, 1992

Stanford University refused to patent this idea so Madey filed for a patent on his own. In the following years, he developed an innovative laser research program which was highly regarded in the scientific community. An opportunity arose for Madey to leave Stanford, taking a tenured position at the Physics Department of Duke University, which Madey accepted in 1988, moving his FEL research laboratory with him in 1989. This laboratory contained substantial equipment which required Duke to build an addition to its physics building to house the lab. In addition, while at Stanford, Madey had obtained sole ownership of two patents practiced by some of the equipment in the FEL lab.

== Patent litigation ==
At Duke, Madey served for almost a decade as director of the FEL lab. During that time the lab continued to achieve success both in securing research funding and in generating scientific breakthroughs. A dispute arose, however, between Madey and Duke. Duke contends that, despite his scientific prowess, Madey had ineffectively managed the lab, resulting in a negative external review of the science and management in his lab. Madey contends that Duke sought to use the lab's equipment for research areas outside the allocated scope of certain government funding, and that when he objected, Duke sought to remove him as lab director. Duke eventually removed Madey as director of the lab in 1997. The removal is not at issue in this appeal, however, it is the genesis of a unique patent infringement case. As a result of his removal from the directorship, Madey resigned from Duke in 1998. Duke, however, continued to operate some of the equipment in the lab. Madey then sued Duke for patent infringement of his two patents, and brought a variety of other claims.

Initially, Madey suffered judicial setback, but later appeals courts found in his favor and made a historic judgment in his favor. In Madey v. Duke University, 307 F.3d 1351, 1362 (Fed. Cir. 2002)], the Federal Circuit Court of Appeals on October 3, 2002, effectively ended a 170-year-old practice of allowing scientists to freely borrow patented technologies for limited use in basic research that is not aimed at commercial use.

== Awards ==
Madey was awarded the Stuart Ballantine Medal from The Franklin Institute in 1989.

Madey received the 2012 Robert R. Wilson Prize for Achievement in the Physics of Particle Accelerators, from the American Physical Society "For the invention and first experimental demonstration of the free electron laser and important contributions to its conceptual development."

Madey was awarded the Willis E. Lamb Award for Laser Science and Quantum Optics in 2016.
