= Smith–Purcell effect =

Precursor of the free-electron laser

The Smith–Purcell effect was the precursor of the free-electron laser (FEL). It was studied by Steve Smith, a graduate student under the guidance of Edward Purcell. In their experiment, they sent an energetic beam of electrons very closely parallel to the surface of a ruled optical diffraction grating, and thereby generated visible light. Smith showed there was negligible effect on the trajectory of the inducing electrons. Essentially, this is a form of Cherenkov radiation where the phase velocity of the light has been altered by the periodic grating. However, unlike Cherenkov radiation, there is no minimum or threshold particle velocity.

Smith–Purcell radiation is particularly attractive for applications involving non-destructive beam diagnostics (bunch-length diagnostics in accelerators for example) and especially as a viable THz radiation source, which has further broad-range uses in diverse and high-impact fields like materials sciences, biotechnology, security and communications, manufacturing and medicine. Operating at THz frequencies also allows for potentially large accelerating gradients (~10s GeV/m) to be realised. This, paired with plasma-wakefield acceleration methods under development and linear accelerator (linac) technology, could pave the way to next-generation, compact (and hence cheaper), less prone to RF breakdown (current limits for surface E fields are of the order of 10s-100 MV/m), high energy output linacs.

== Background ==
Charged particles usually radiate/generate radiation via two different mechanisms:

1. Acceleration or change of direction of motion: e.g. Bremsstrahlung radiation (e.g. in X-ray tubes), synchrotron radiation (as in FEL due to electron beams going through wiggler/ undulator set-ups, or a beam energy-loss mechanism in circular colliders).
2. Polarisation: A moving charge has a dynamic Coulomb field. For a conducting/polarisable material, the interaction between this field and the charges in the material/ medium could generate radiation. This includes Cherenkov and transition radiation, where the particle moves within the medium which generates the radiation, but also diffraction radiation, where (usually relativistic) particles move in the vicinity of the target material, generating for example, optical diffraction radiation (ODR) and Smith–Purcell radiation (SPR).

The benefit of using polarisation radiation in particular is the lack of direct effect on the original beam; the beam inducing the radiative emission can continue its original path unaltered and having induced EM radiation. This is unlike the bremsstrahlung or synchrotron effects which actually alter or bend the incoming beam. Due to this non-destructive feature, SPR has become an interesting prospect for beam diagnostics, also offering the possibility of reliable technologies due to theoretically no contact or scattering interactions between the beam and the target.

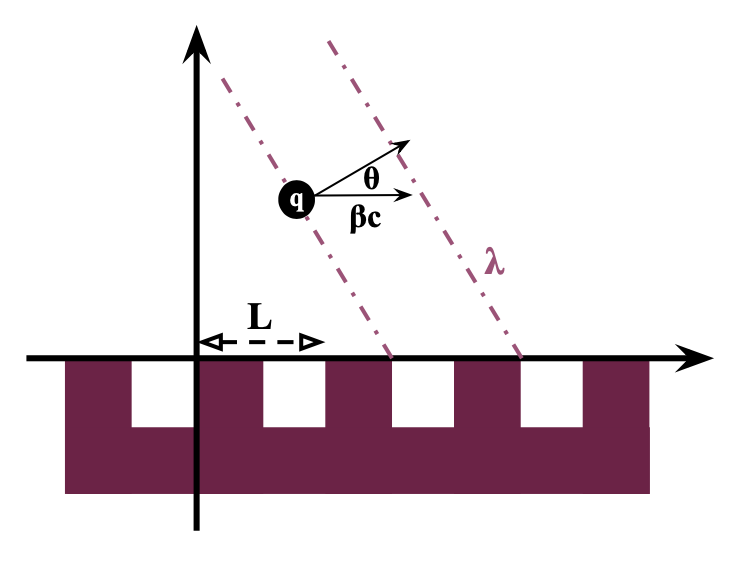
The Smith–Purcell effect

=== Dispersion relation ===
When a charged particle travels above a periodic grating (or periodic media inhomogeneity), a current is induced on the surface of the grating. This induced current then emits radiation at the discontinuities of the grating due to the scattering of the Coulomb field of the induced charges at the grating boundaries. The dispersion relation for the Smith–Purcell effect (SPE) is given as follows:

$$\lambda = \frac{L}{n}\left(\frac{1}{\beta}-\cos{\theta}\right)$$,

where the wavelength $\lambda$ is observed at an angle $\theta$ to the direction of the electron beam for the $n^{th}$ order reflection mode, and $L$ is the grating period and $\beta$ is the relative electron velocity ($v/c$). This relation can be derived through considering energy and momentum conservation laws.
