= Triveni Rao =

Indian-American physicist

Triveni Rao is an Indian and American physicist and an expert on physics instrumentation. She is a senior physicist at the Brookhaven National Laboratory, acting head of the Instrumentation Facilities Division at the laboratory, and an adjunct professor in the Department of Physics and Astronomy at Stony Brook University.

== Education and career ==
Originally from India, Rao completed a Ph.D. in physics at the University of Illinois Chicago in 1983, after also earning a master's degree there. After working in industry for a year, she joined the Brookhaven National Laboratory in 1985.

Formerly the head of the Laser Applications Group at Brookhaven, she subsequently became associate division head of the Instrumentation Division, and then acting head of the Instrumentation Facilities Division.

In 2023 she was funded by the Indian government by a Visiting Advance Joint Research Faculty Fellowship, for a visiting position at the Inter-University Accelerator Centre in Delhi.

== Research ==
Rao's expertise involves instrumentation for high-energy physics, including photocathodes and photoinjectors, devices for turning laser pulses into high-intensity electron beams, as well as high-energy superconducting radiofrequency sources.

With David H. Dowell, Rao is the editor of the book An Engineering Guide To Photoinjectors, published as an open access work on arXiv.org.

== Recognition ==
Rao was named as a Fellow of the American Physical Society, in the 2008 class of fellows, "for pioneering work on metal photo cathodes for high brightness RF injectors".

In 2012, Rao was honored as a distinguished Asian American professional at the Stony Brook University Asian Pacific American Heritage Month Celebration.
