= Asia Task Force =

British government advisory group on trade in Asia

The Asia Task Force (ATF) was a British government advisory group in the United Kingdom with the overall aim of boosting trade and investment between the UK and high-growth and emerging markets in Asia. The ATF was created by Gordon Brown (then serving as Chancellor of the Exchequer) on 2 December 2004 and existed until circa. 2013.

== History ==
The first full meeting of the ATF was held on 27 October 2005. The Chancellor opened proceedings with a speech on the growing importance of Asia in the world economy and said he would welcome ideas and policy proposals from the ATF for the government to consider.

The ATF meets around twice a year - the minutes and membership details were published on the UK trade and Investment website.

Members of the Asia Task Force are senior British business leaders and members of academia. It was co-chaired by the Secretary of State for Business, Innovation and Skills.

On assuming the Co-Chairmanship of the ATF in May 2010, Vince Cable said:

If we are looking for growth, we should be looking to Asia. Asia is driving the global recovery and its growing middle classes are seeking more of what we can produce. We want UK businesses to export more goods and services to these markets. Through UK Trade & Investment, we will help British companies to play their full part.

— Vince Cable,

The group seems to have been disbanded around 2013 and its functions absorbed by its parent organization, the UK Trade & Investment department.

== Objectives ==
1. To identify the current and future challenges faced by UK companies operating in Asian markets and to suggest practical ways to overcome and anticipate them;
2. To raise awareness among UK companies of the potential opportunities in these markets and to provide a resource to support companies seeking to do business in Asia;
3. To contribute to the UK's response to globalisation by bringing together the business community, Government and academia to develop a coherent strategy.

== Activities ==
While it was operating, UK Trade & Investment regularly ran ‘Doing Business in Asia - Meet the Experts' events throughout the UK designed to galvanise more companies to explore opportunities in key Asian markets on the advice and recommendation of the Asia Task Force.

Information was provided on the Doing Business in Asia: Meet the Experts website.
