= Free-electron laser =

Laser using electron beam in vacuum as gain medium

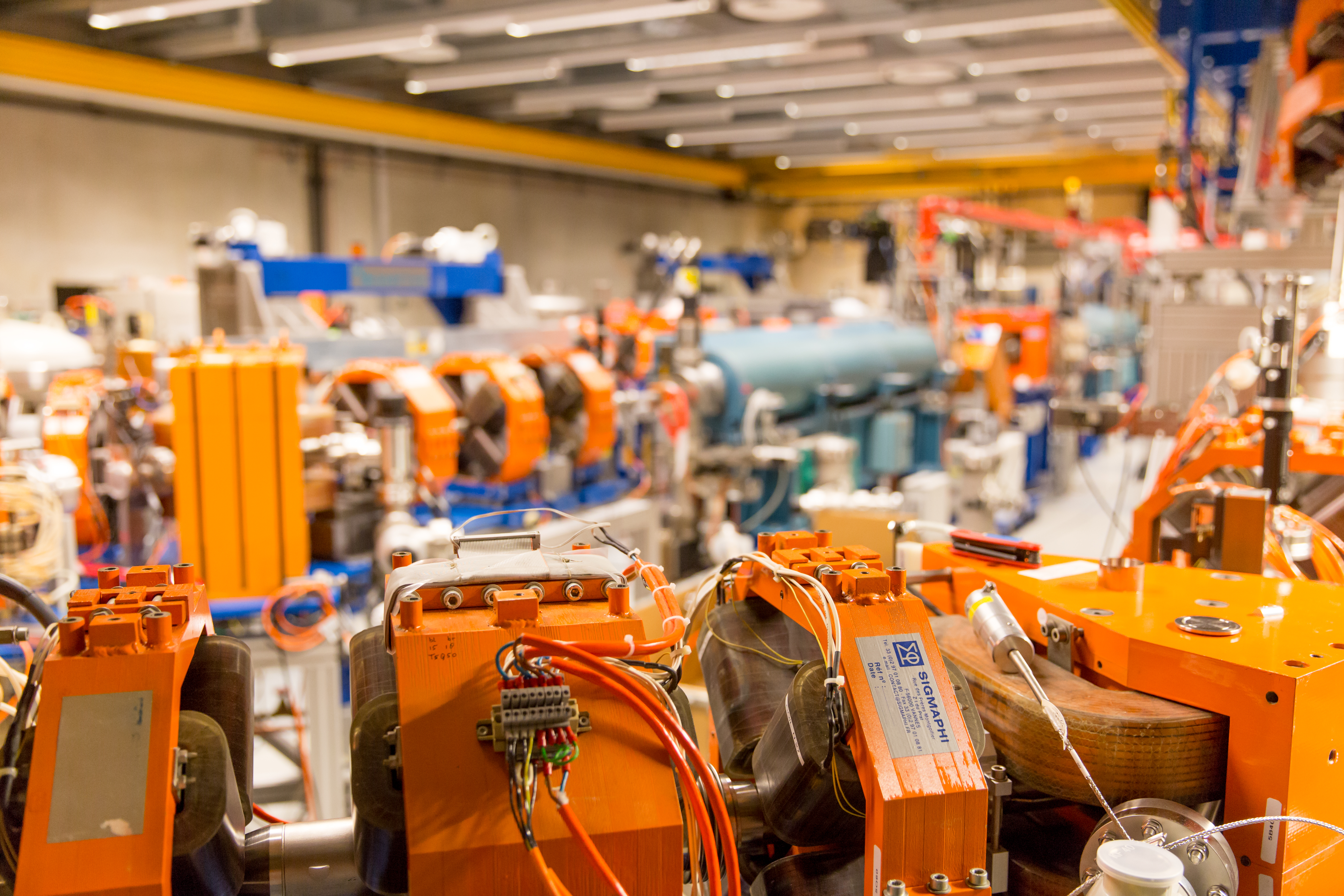
The free-electron laser FELIX at Radboud University, Netherlands

A free-electron laser (FEL) is a fourth-generation light source producing extremely brilliant and short pulses of radiation. An FEL functions much as a laser but employs relativistic electrons as a gain medium instead of using stimulated emission from atomic or molecular excitations. In an FEL, a bunch of electrons passes through a magnetic structure called an undulator or wiggler to generate radiation, which re-interacts with the electrons to make them emit coherent light, exponentially increasing its intensity.

As electron kinetic energy and undulator parameters are adaptable, free-electron lasers can be tuned and can offer a wider frequency range than any other type of laser, with wavelengths ranging from microwaves through terahertz radiation and infrared, to the visible spectrum, ultraviolet, and X-ray.

Schematic representation of an undulator, at the core of a free-electron laser

The first free-electron laser was developed by John Madey in 1971 at Stanford University using technology developed by Hans Motz and his coworkers, who built an undulator at Stanford in 1953, using the wiggler magnetic configuration. Madey used a 43 MeV electron beam and 5-metre-long (16 ft) wiggler to amplify a signal.

== Beam creation ==
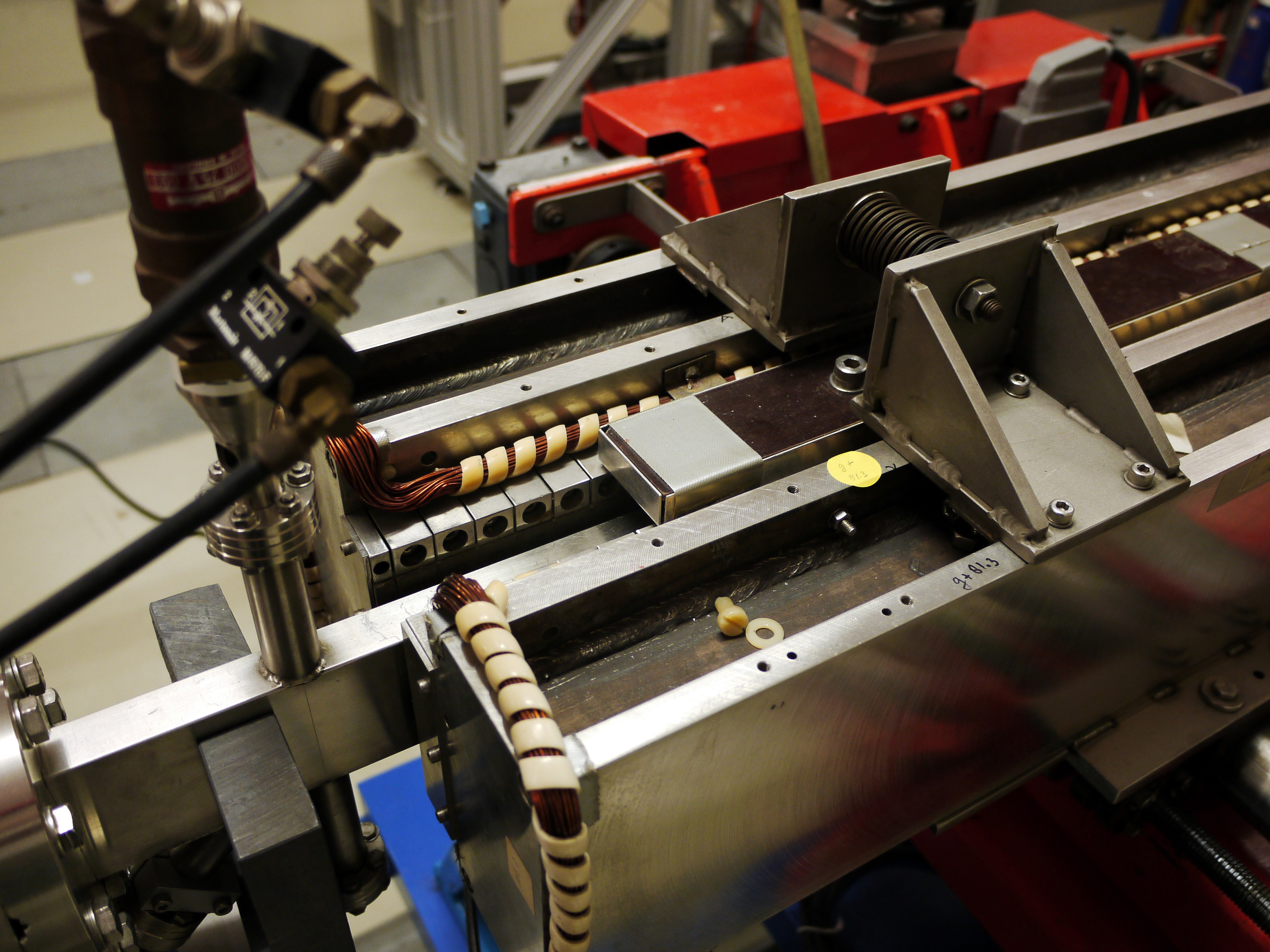
The undulator of FELIX

To create an FEL, an electron gun is used. A beam of electrons is generated by a short laser pulse illuminating a photocathode located inside a microwave cavity and accelerated to almost the speed of light in a device called a photoinjector. The beam is further accelerated to a design energy by a particle accelerator, usually a linear particle accelerator. Then the beam passes through a periodic arrangement of magnets with alternating poles across the beam path, which creates a side to side magnetic field. The direction of the beam is called the longitudinal direction, while the direction across the beam path is called transverse. This array of magnets is called an undulator or a wiggler, because the Lorentz force of the field forces the electrons in the beam to wiggle transversely, traveling along a sinusoidal path about the axis of the undulator.

The transverse acceleration of the electrons across this path results in the release of photons, which are monochromatic but still incoherent, because the electromagnetic waves from randomly distributed electrons interfere constructively and destructively in time. The resulting radiation power scales linearly with the number of electrons. Mirrors at each end of the undulator create an optical cavity, causing the radiation to form standing waves, or alternately an external excitation laser is provided. The radiation becomes sufficiently strong that the transverse electric field of the radiation beam interacts with the transverse electron current created by the sinusoidal wiggling motion, causing some electrons to gain and others to lose energy to the optical field via the ponderomotive force.

This energy modulation evolves into electron density (current) modulations with a period of one optical wavelength. The electrons are thus longitudinally clumped into microbunches, separated by one optical wavelength along the axis. Whereas an undulator alone would cause the electrons to radiate independently (incoherently), the radiation emitted by the bunched electrons is in phase, and the fields add together coherently.

The radiation intensity grows, causing additional microbunching of the electrons, which continue to radiate in phase with each other. This process continues until the electrons are completely microbunched and the radiation reaches a saturated power several orders of magnitude higher than that of the undulator radiation.

The wavelength of the radiation emitted can be readily tuned by adjusting the energy of the electron beam or the magnetic-field strength of the undulators.

FELs are relativistic machines since the electrons driving the laser move at relativistic speeds—that is, at velocities very close to the speed of light. The wavelength of the emitted radiation, $\lambda_r$, is given by

$$\lambda_r = \frac{\lambda_u}{2 \gamma^2}\left(1+\frac{K^2}{2}\right)$$

or when the wiggler strength parameter K, discussed below, is small

$$\lambda_r \propto \frac{\lambda_u}{2 \gamma^2}$$

where $\lambda_u$ is the undulator wavelength (the spatial period of the magnetic field), $\gamma$ is the relativistic Lorentz factor and the proportionality constant depends on the undulator geometry and is of the order of 1.

This formula can be understood as a combination of two relativistic effects. Imagine you are sitting on an electron passing through the undulator. Due to Lorentz contraction the undulator is shortened by a $\gamma$ factor and the electron experiences much shorter undulator wavelength $\lambda_u/\gamma$. However, the radiation emitted at this wavelength is observed in the laboratory frame of reference and the relativistic Doppler effect brings the second $\gamma$ factor to the above formula. In an X-ray FEL the typical undulator wavelength of 1 cm is transformed to X-ray wavelengths on the order of 1 nm by $\gamma$ ≈ 2000, i.e. the electrons have to travel with the speed of 0.9999998c.

=== Wiggler strength parameter K ===
K, a dimensionless parameter, defines the wiggler strength as the relationship between the length of a period and the radius of bend,

$$K = \frac{\gamma \lambda_u}{ 2 \pi \rho } = \frac{e B_0 \lambda_u}{2 \pi m_e c}$$

where $\rho$ is the bending radius, $B_0$ is the applied magnetic field, $m_e$ is the electron mass, and $e$ is the elementary charge.

Expressed in practical units, the dimensionless undulator parameter is $K=0.934 \cdot B_0\,\text{[T]} \cdot \lambda_u\,\text{[cm]}$.

=== Quantum effects ===
In most cases, the theory of classical electromagnetism adequately accounts for the behavior of free electron lasers. For sufficiently short wavelengths, quantum effects of electron recoil and shot noise may have to be considered.

== Construction ==
Free-electron lasers require the use of an electron accelerator with its associated shielding, as accelerated electrons can be a radiation hazard if not properly contained. These accelerators are typically powered by klystrons, which require a high-voltage supply. The electron beam must be maintained in a vacuum, which requires the use of numerous vacuum pumps along the beam path. While this equipment is bulky and expensive, free-electron lasers can achieve very high peak powers, and the tunability of FELs makes them highly desirable in many disciplines, including chemistry, structure determination of molecules in biology, medical diagnosis, and nondestructive testing.

=== Infrared and terahertz FELs ===
The Fritz Haber Institute in Berlin completed a mid-infrared and terahertz FEL in 2013.

At Helmholtz-Zentrum Dresden - Rossendorf two terahertz and mid-infrared FEL-based sources are in operation. FELBE is an FEL equipped with a cavity with continuous pulsing with a repetition rate of 13 MHz, pulsing with 1 kHz by applying a pulse picker, and macrobunch operation with bunch length > 100 μs and macrobunch repetition rates ≤ 25 Hz. Pulse duration and pulse energy vary with wavelength and lie in the range from 1 - 25 ps and 100 nJ - few μJ, respectively. The TELBE facility is based on a superradiant undulator offering THz pulses ranging from 0.1 THz to 2.5 THz at repetition rates up to 500 kHz.

=== X-ray FELs ===
The lack of mirror materials that can reflect extreme ultraviolet and x-rays means that X-ray free electron lasers (XFEL) need to work without a resonant cavity. Consequently, the beam is produced by a single pass of radiation through the undulator. This requires enough amplification over a single pass to produce a useful beam.

XFELs use undulator sections tens or hundreds of meters long. This allows XFELs to produce the brightest X-ray pulses of any human-made x-ray source. The intense pulses exploit the principle of self-amplified spontaneous emission (SASE), which leads to microbunching. Initially all electrons are distributed evenly and emit only incoherent spontaneous radiation. Through the interaction of this radiation and the electrons' oscillations, they drift into microbunches separated by a distance equal to one radiation wavelength. This interaction drives the electrons to emit coherent radiation. Emitted radiation can reinforce itself perfectly whereby wave crests and wave troughs are optimally superimposed on each other. This results in an exponential power increase, leading to high beam intensities and laser-like properties.

Examples of facilities operating on the SASE FEL principle include:

- Free electron LASer in Hamburg (FLASH)
- Linac Coherent Light Source (LCLS) at the SLAC National Accelerator Laboratory
- European X-ray Free-Electron Laser (EuXFEL) in Hamburg
- SPring-8 Compact SASE Source (SCSS) in Japan
- SwissFEL at the Paul Scherrer Institute in Switzerland
- SACLA at the RIKEN Harima Institute in Japan
- PAL-XFEL (Pohang Accelerator Laboratory X-ray Free-Electron Laser) in Korea

In 2022, an upgrade to Stanford University's Linac Coherent Light Source (LCLS-II) used temperatures around −271 °C to produce 10^{6} pulses/second of near light-speed electrons, using superconducting niobium cavities.

==== Seeding and Self-seeding ====
One problem with SASE FELs is the lack of temporal coherence due to a noisy startup process. To avoid this, one can "seed" an FEL with a laser tuned to the resonance of the FEL. Such a temporally coherent seed can be produced by more conventional means, such as by high harmonic generation (HHG) using an optical laser pulse. This results in coherent amplification of the input signal; in effect, the output laser quality is characterized by the seed. While HHG seeds are available at wavelengths down to the extreme ultraviolet, seeding is not feasible at x-ray wavelengths due to the lack of conventional x-ray lasers.

In late 2010, in Italy, the seeded-FEL source FERMI@Elettra started commissioning, at the Trieste Synchrotron Laboratory. FERMI@Elettra is a single-pass FEL user-facility covering the wavelength range from 100 nm (12 eV) to 10 nm (124 eV), located next to the third-generation synchrotron radiation facility ELETTRA in Trieste, Italy.

In 2001, at Brookhaven National Laboratory, a seeding technique called "High-Gain Harmonic-Generation" that works to X-ray wavelength has been developed. The technique, which can be multiple-staged in an FEL to achieve increasingly shorter wavelengths, utilizes a longitudinal shift of the radiation relative to the electron bunch to avoid the reduced beam quality caused by a previous stage. This longitudinal staging along the beam is called "Fresh-Bunch". This technique was demonstrated at x-ray wavelength at Trieste Synchrotron Laboratory.

A similar staging approach, named "Fresh-Slice", was demonstrated at the Paul Scherrer Institut, also at X-ray wavelengths. In the Fresh Slice the short X-ray pulse produced at the first stage is moved to a fresh part of the electron bunch by a transverse tilt of the bunch.

In 2012, scientists working on the LCLS found an alternative solution to the seeding limitation for x-ray wavelengths by self-seeding the laser with its own beam after being filtered through a diamond monochromator. The resulting intensity and monochromaticity of the beam were unprecedented and allowed new experiments to be conducted involving manipulating atoms and imaging molecules. Other labs around the world are incorporating the technique into their equipment.

== Research ==
=== Biomedical ===
==== Basic research ====
Researchers have explored X-ray free-electron lasers as an alternative to synchrotron light sources that have been the workhorses of protein crystallography and cell biology.

Exceptionally bright and fast X-rays can image proteins using x-ray crystallography. This technique allows first-time imaging of proteins that do not stack in a way that allows imaging by conventional techniques, 25% of the total number of proteins. Resolutions of 0.8 nm have been achieved with pulse durations of 30 femtoseconds. To get a clear view, a resolution of 0.1–0.3 nm is required. The short pulse durations allow images of X-ray diffraction patterns to be recorded before the molecules are destroyed. The bright, fast X-rays were produced at the Linac Coherent Light Source at SLAC. As of 2014, LCLS was the world's most powerful X-ray FEL.

Due to the increased repetition rates of the next-generation X-ray FEL sources, such as the European XFEL, the expected number of diffraction patterns is also expected to increase by a substantial amount. The increase in the number of diffraction patterns will place a large strain on existing analysis methods. To combat this, several methods have been researched to sort the huge amount of data that typical X-ray FEL experiments will generate. While the various methods have been shown to be effective, it is clear that to pave the way towards single-particle X-ray FEL imaging at full repetition rates, several challenges have to be overcome before the next resolution revolution can be achieved.

One remaining challenge includes an efficient way to deliver single particles to the X-ray beam. Several different approaches are in development to address this issue, which includes electrospray ionization, gas-dynamic virtual nozzles and liquid sheet jets, which aim to provide stable and reproducible sample streams.

It is of significance to consistently ensure that the particles intersect with the X-ray beam. As a result of introducing singular particles at a time, the hit rate on the beam is typically very low. This represents a major limitation with single-particle X-ray FEL imaging. Improvements to sample concentration and the precision of the delivery method is therefore crucial for increasing the efficiency of data collection.

Taking advantage of the selectivity and sensitivity when combining infrared ion spectroscopy and mass spectrometry, scientists can provide a structural fingerprint of small molecules in biological samples, like blood or urine. This new methodology is generating new possibilities to better understand metabolic diseases and develop diagnostic and therapeutic strategies.

==== Surgery ====
Research by Glenn Edwards and colleagues at Vanderbilt University's FEL Center in 1994 found that soft tissues including skin, cornea, and brain tissue could be cut, or ablated, using infrared FEL wavelengths around 6.45 micrometres with minimal collateral damage to adjacent tissue. This led to surgeries on humans, the first ever using a free-electron laser. Starting in 1999, Copeland and Konrad performed three surgeries in which they resected meningioma brain tumors. Beginning in 2000, Joos and Mawn performed five surgeries that cut a window in the sheath of the optic nerve, to test the efficacy for optic nerve sheath fenestration. These eight surgeries produced results consistent with the standard of care and with the added benefit of minimal collateral damage. A review of FELs for medical uses is given in the 1st edition of Tunable Laser Applications.

==== Fat removal ====
Several small, clinical lasers tunable in the 6 to 7 micrometre range with pulse structure and energy to give minimal collateral damage in soft tissue have been created. At Vanderbilt, there exists a Raman shifted system pumped by an Alexandrite laser.

Rox Anderson proposed the medical application of the free-electron laser in melting fats without harming the overlying skin. At infrared wavelengths, water in tissue was heated by the laser, but at wavelengths corresponding to 915, 1210 and 1720 nm, subsurface lipids were differentially heated more strongly than water. The possible applications of this selective photothermolysis (heating tissues using light) include the selective destruction of sebum lipids to treat acne, as well as targeting other lipids associated with cellulite and body fat as well as fatty plaques that form in arteries which can help treat atherosclerosis and heart disease.

=== Military ===
FEL technology is being evaluated by the US Navy as a candidate for an anti-aircraft and anti-missile directed-energy weapon. The Thomas Jefferson National Accelerator Facility's FEL has demonstrated over 14 kW power output. Compact multi-megawatt class FEL weapons are undergoing research. On June 9, 2009, the Office of Naval Research announced it had awarded Raytheon a contract to develop a 100 kW experimental FEL. On March 18, 2010 Boeing Directed Energy Systems announced the completion of an initial design for U.S. Naval use. A prototype FEL system was demonstrated, with a full-power prototype scheduled by 2018.

== FEL prize winners ==
The FEL prize is given to a person who has contributed significantly to the advancement of the field of free-electron lasers. In addition, it gives the international FEL community the opportunity to recognize its members for their outstanding achievements. The prize winners are announced at the FEL conference, which currently takes place every two years.

- 1988 John Madey
- 1989 William Colson
- 1990 Todd Smith and Luis Elias
- 1991 Phillip Sprangle and Nikolai Vinokurov
- 1992 Robert Phillips
- 1993 Roger Warren
- 1994 Alberto Renieri and Giuseppe Dattoli
- 1995 Richard Pantell and George Bekefi
- 1996 Charles Brau
- 1997 Kwang-Je Kim
- 1998 John Walsh
- 1999 Claudio Pellegrini
- 2000 Stephen V. Benson, Eisuke J. Minehara, and George R. Neil
- 2001 Michel Billardon, Marie-Emmanuelle Couprie, and Jean-Michel Ortega
- 2002 H. Alan Schwettman and Alexander F.G. van der Meer
- 2003 Li-Hua Yu
- 2004 Vladimir Litvinenko and Hiroyuki Hama
- 2005 Avraham (Avi) Gover
- 2006 Evgueni Saldin and Jörg Rossbach
- 2007 Ilan Ben-Zvi and James Rosenzweig
- 2008 Samuel Krinsky
- 2009 David Dowell and Paul Emma
- 2010 Sven Reiche
- 2011 Tsumoru Shintake
- 2012 John Galayda
- 2013 Luca Giannessi and Young Uk Jeong
- 2014 Zhirong Huang and William Fawley
- 2015 Mikhail Yurkov and Evgeny Schneidmiller
- 2017 Bruce Carlsten, Dinh Nguyen, and Richard Sheffield
- 2019 Enrico Allaria, Gennady Stupakov, and Alex Lumpkin
- 2022 Brian McNeil and Ying Wu
- 2024 Toru Hara, Hitoshi Tanaka, and Takashi Tanaka

=== Young Scientist FEL Award ===
The Young Scientist FEL Award (or "Young Investigator FEL Prize") is intended to honor outstanding contributions to FEL science and technology from a person who is less than 37 years of age at the time of the FEL conference.

- 2008 Michael Röhrs
- 2009 Pavel Evtushenko
- 2010 Guillaume Lambert
- 2011 Marie Labat
- 2012 Daniel F. Ratner
- 2013 Dao Xiang
- 2014 Erik Hemsing
- 2015 Agostino Marinelli and Haixiao Deng
- 2017 Eugenio Ferrari and Eléonore Roussel
- 2019 Joe Duris and Chao Feng
- 2022 Zhen Zhang, Jiawei Yan, and Svitozar Serkez
- 2024 Philipp Dijkstal

== See also ==
- Steady-state microbunching (SSMB)
- Energy recovery linac (ERL)
- Accelerator physics codes
- Bremsstrahlung
- Cyclotron radiation
- Electron wake
- European X-ray free-electron laser
- Gyrotron
- International Linear Collider
- Laser acronyms
- Smith–Purcell effect
- Synchrotron radiation
