= Lawrence Berkeley National Laboratory =

Laboratory Berkeley, California, and Oakland, California, US

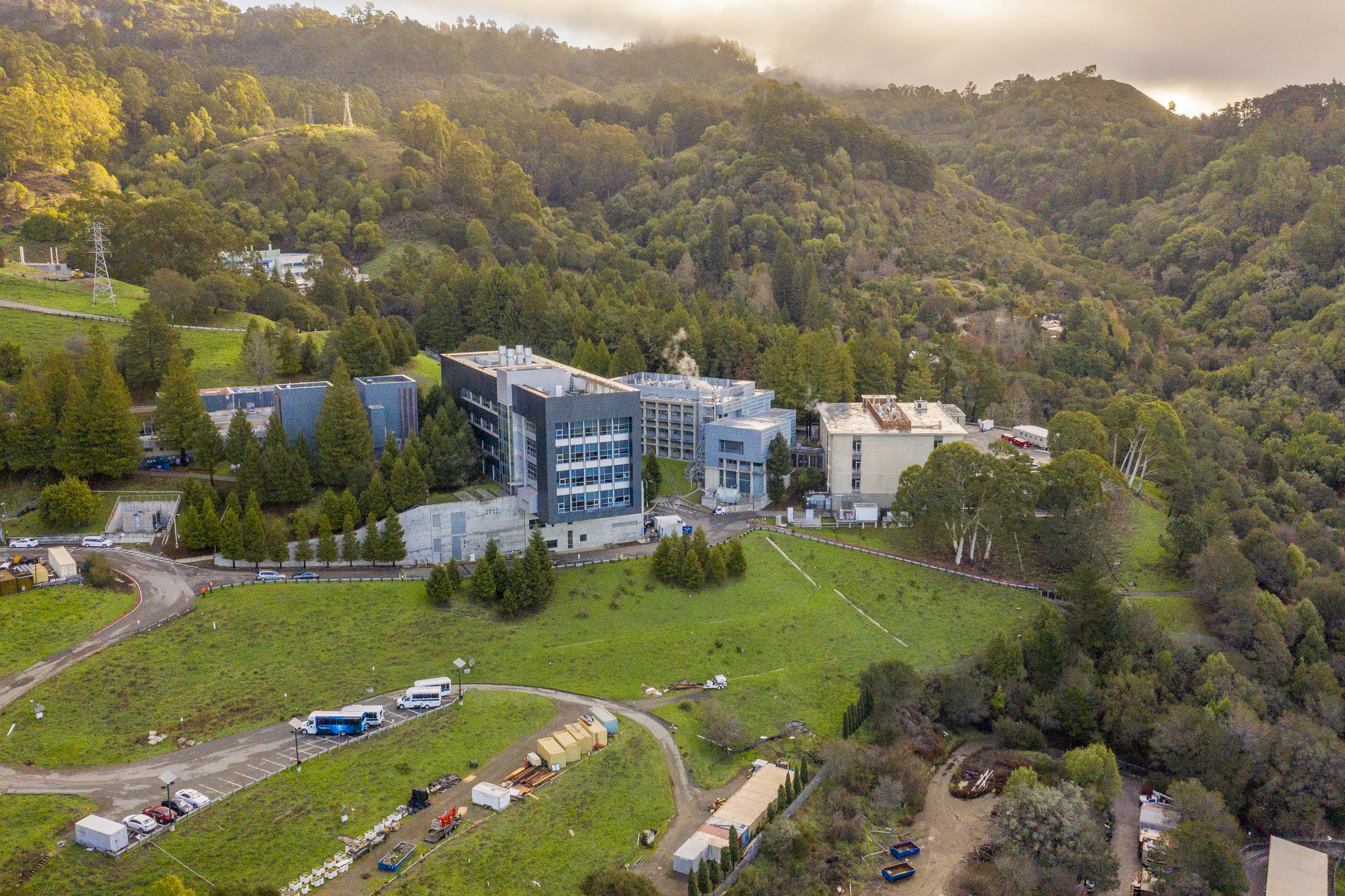
- The lab's Molecular Foundry and surrounding buildings
- Motto: Bringing science solutions to the world
- Established: August 26, 1931; 95 years ago
- Research type: Scientific research and energy technologies
- Budget: US$1.495 billion (2023)
- Director: Katherine Yelick
- Staff: 3,804
- Students: 800
- Location: 1 Cyclotron Road, Berkeley, California, United States; 37°52′33″N 122°14′55″W
- Campus: 200 acres (81 ha)
- Affiliations: United States Department of Energy
- Operating agency: University of California
- Nobel laureates: 17
- Website: lbl.gov

Lawrence Berkeley National Laboratory (LBNL, Berkeley Lab) is a federally funded research and development center in the hills of Berkeley, California, and Oakland, California, United States. Established in 1931 by the University of California (UC), the laboratory is sponsored by the United States Department of Energy and administered by the UC system. Ernest Lawrence, who won the Nobel prize for inventing the cyclotron, founded the lab and served as its director until his death in 1958. Located in the Berkeley Hills, the lab overlooks the campus of the University of California, Berkeley.

== Scientific research ==
The research at Berkeley Lab has four main themes: discovery science, energy, earth systems, and the future of science. The Laboratory's 22 scientific divisions are organized within six areas of research: Computing Sciences, Physical Sciences, Earth and Environmental Sciences, Biosciences, Energy Sciences, and Energy Technologies. Lab founder Ernest Lawrence believed that scientific research is best done through teams of individuals with different fields of expertise, working together, and his laboratory still considers that a guiding principle today.

=== Research impact ===
Berkeley Lab scientists have won sixteen Nobel prizes in physics and chemistry, and each one has a street named after them on the Lab campus. 23 Berkeley Lab employees were contributors to reports by the United Nations' Intergovernmental Panel on Climate Change, which shared the Nobel Peace Prize. Fifteen Lab scientists have also won the National Medal of Science, and two have won the National Medal of Technology and Innovation. 82 Berkeley Lab researchers have been elected to membership in the National Academy of Sciences or the National Academy of Engineering.

The Clarivate Highly Cited Research list for 2025 includes 56 researchers who are affiliated with Berkeley Lab. Berkeley Lab also had the greatest research publication impact of any single government laboratory in the world in both physical sciences and chemistry, as measured by Nature Index. The only institutions with higher ranking were national government research agencies for China, France, and Italy, which are networks of research laboratories or smaller research units.

=== Scientific user facilities ===
Much of Berkeley Lab's research impact is built on the capabilities of its unique research facilities. The laboratory manages five national scientific user facilities, which are part of the network of 28 such facilities operated by the DOE Office of Science. These facilities and the expertise of the scientists and engineers who operate them are made available to 14,000 researchers from universities, industry, and government laboratories.

Berkeley Lab operates five major National User Facilities for the DOE Office of Science:

1. The Advanced Light Source (ALS) is a synchrotron light source with 41 beamlines providing ultraviolet, soft x-ray, and hard x-ray light to scientific experiments in a wide variety of fields, including materials science, biology, chemistry, physics, and the environmental sciences.
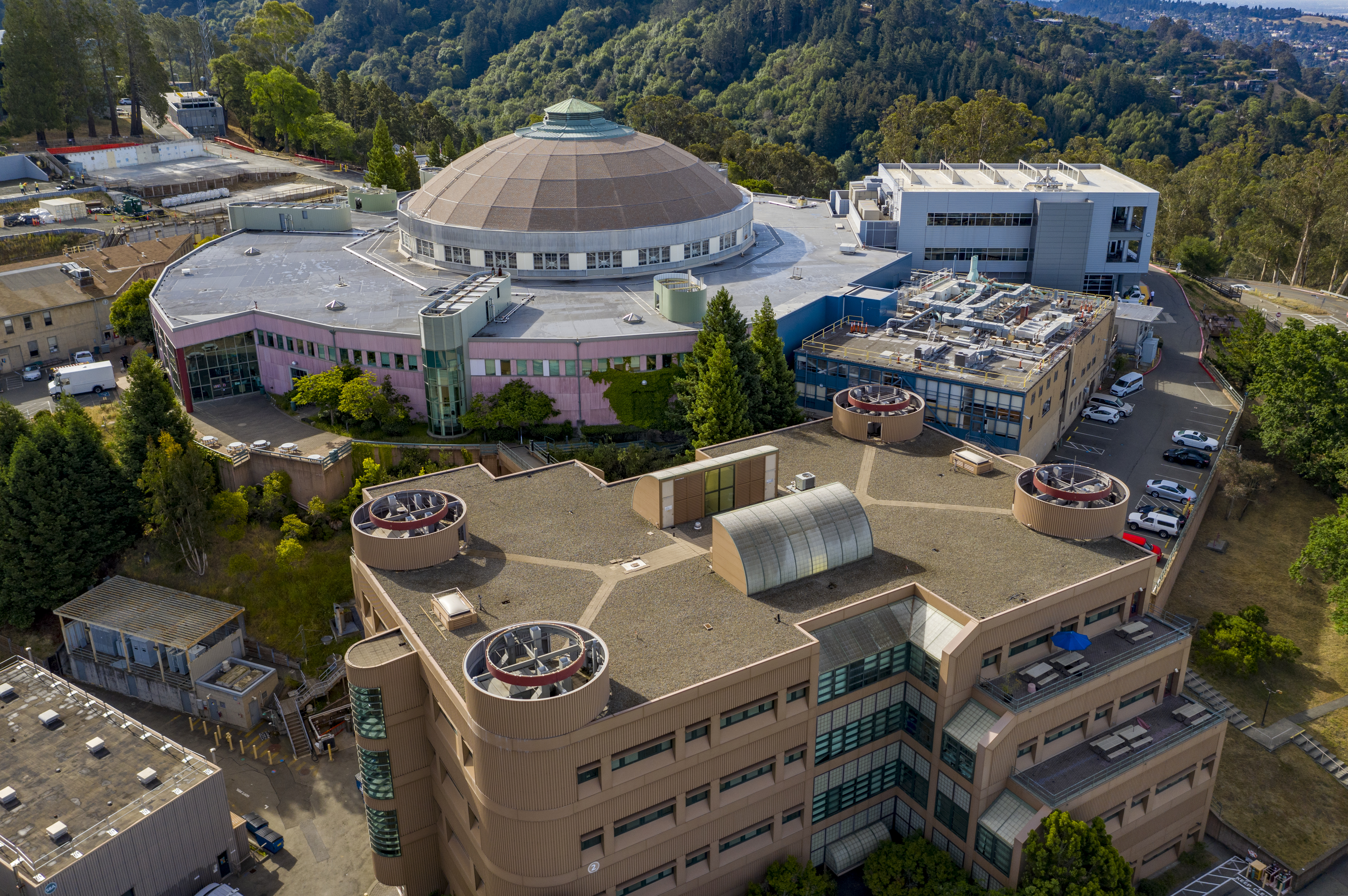
  The Advanced Light Source and surrounding buildings
  The ALS is supported by the DOE Office of Basic Energy Sciences.
2. The Joint Genome Institute (JGI) is a scientific user facility for integrative genomic science, with particular emphasis on the DOE missions of energy and the environment. The JGI provides over 2,000 scientific users with access to the latest generation of genome sequencing and analysis capabilities.
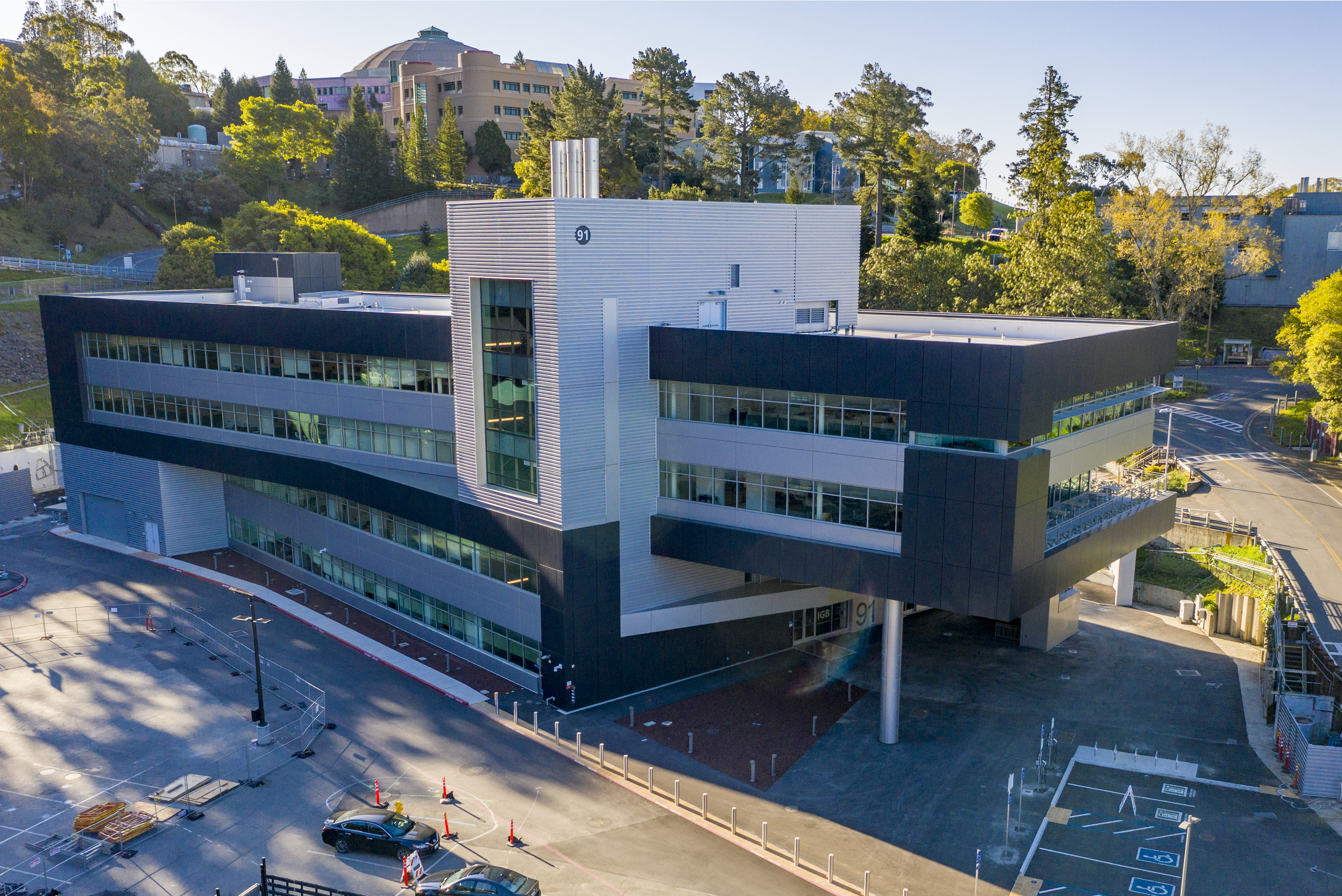
  The Integrative Genomics Building, home to the Joint Genome Institute
3. The Molecular Foundry is a multidisciplinary nanoscience research facility. Its seven research facilities focus on Imaging and Manipulation of Nanostructures, Nanofabrication, Theory of Nanostructured Materials, Inorganic Nanostructures, Biological Nanostructures, Organic and Macromolecular Synthesis, and Electron Microscopy.
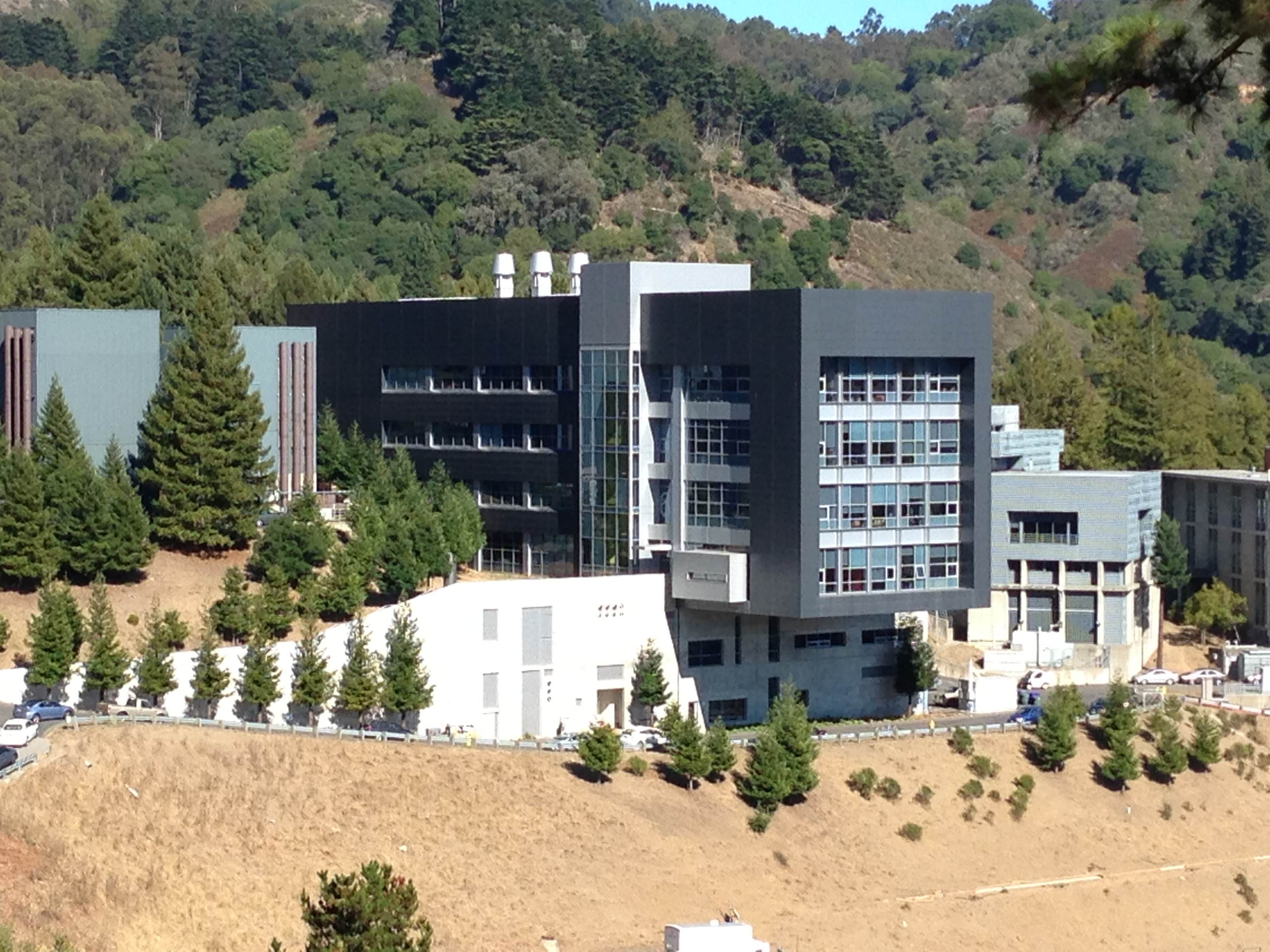
  The Molecular Foundry
4. The National Energy Research Scientific Computing Center (NERSC) is the mission scientific computing facility for the DOE Office of Science, providing high performance computing for over 11,000 scientists working on DOE research programs. NERSC celebrated its 50th anniversary in 2024 by making a video that describes significant events over that 50-year timeline. The Perlmutter system at NERSC was the 5th-ranked supercomputer system in the Top500 (HPL) rankings when it came online in 2021. On May 29, 2025, the Secretary of Energy Chris Wright announced the signing of a contract with Dell to build the next generation of NERSC supercomputer. Joining Wright and Lab Director Michael Witherell at the announcement event were Jennifer Doudna, the Nobel-prize winning biochemist who the new system will be named after, and Jensen Huang, then CEO of NVIDIA. The Doudna system will be one of the first supercomputers to use the NVIDIA Rubin microarchitecture for GPUs when it launches in 2026.
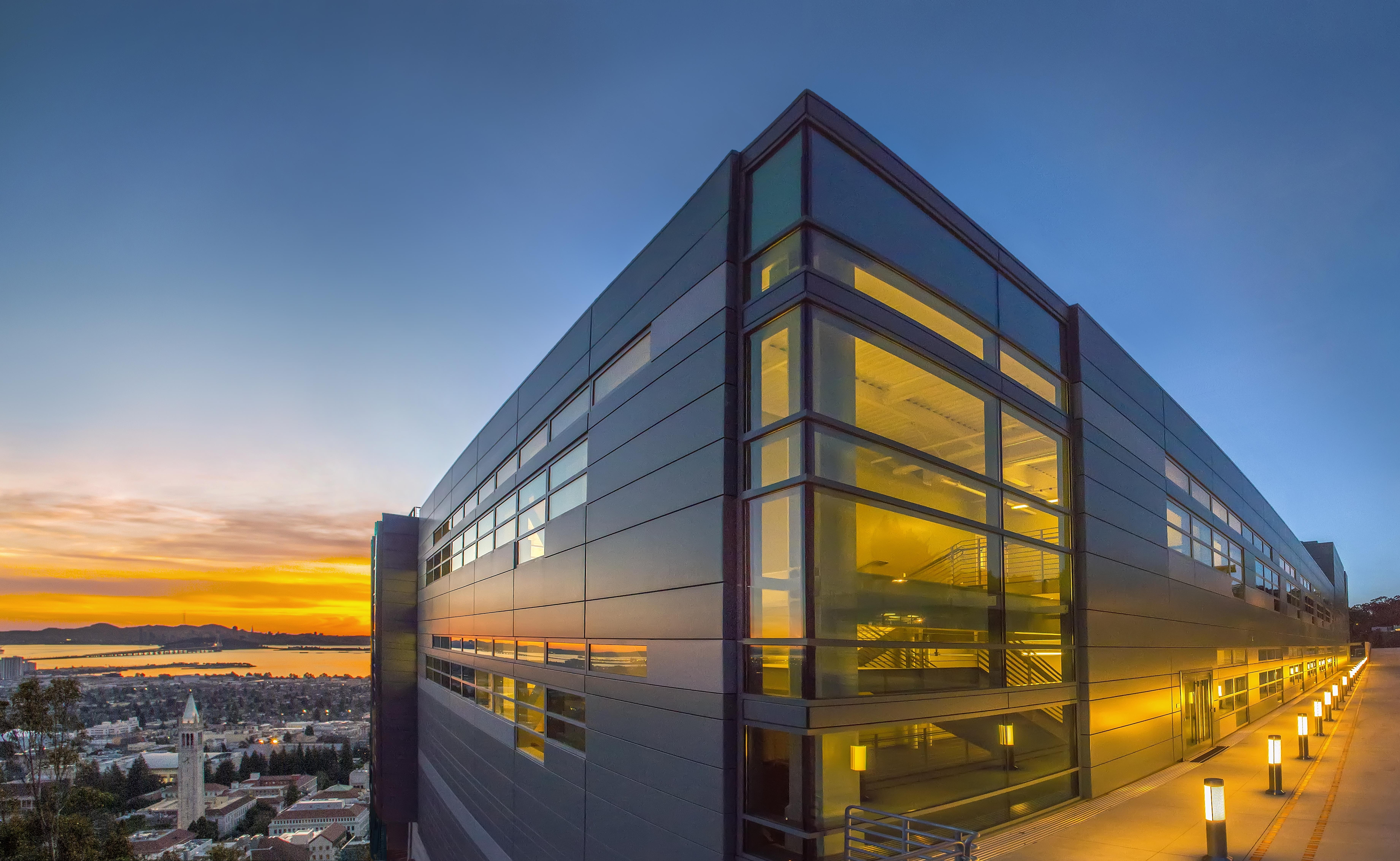
  Wang Hall, home of NERSC and ESnet
5. The Energy Sciences Network (ESnet) is a high-speed research network serving DOE scientists with their experimental facilities and collaborators worldwide. The upgraded network infrastructure launched in 2022 is optimized for very large scientific data flows, and the network transports roughly 35 petabytes of traffic each month.

=== Team science and technology ===
Much of the research at Berkeley Lab is done by researchers from several disciplines and multiple institutions working together as a large team focused on shared scientific goals. Berkeley is either the lead partner or one of the leads in several research institutes and hubs, including the following:

1. The Joint BioEnergy Institute (JBEI). JBEI's mission is to establish the scientific knowledge and new technologies needed to transform the maximum amount of carbon available in bioenergy crops into biofuels and bioproducts. JBEI is one of four U.S. Department of Energy (DOE) Bioenergy Research Centers (BRCs). In 2023, the DOE announced the commitment of $590M to support the BRCs for the next five years.
2. The Advanced Biofuels and Bioproducts Process Development Unit (ABPDU). The ABPDU, funded by the U.S. Department of Energy's Bioenergy Technologies Office, was established in 2009 to help biomanufacturing companies scale up innovative biotechnologies and transition them to the marketplace. The facility provides biomanufacturing startups and companies the specific equipment and expertise needed to pilot new biotechnology products.
3. The National Alliance for Water Innovation (NAWI). NAWI aims to secure an affordable, energy-efficient, and resilient water supply for the US economy through decentralized, fit-for-purpose processing. NAWI is supported primarily by the DOE Office of Energy Efficiency and Renewable Energy, partnering with the California Department of Water Resources, the California State Water Resources Control Board. Berkeley Lab is the lead partner, with founding partners Oak Ridge National Laboratory (ORNL) and the National Renewable Energy Laboratory (NREL).
4. The Liquid Sunlight Alliance (LiSA). LiSA's Mission is to establish the science principles by which durable coupled microenvironments can be co-designed to efficiently and selectively generate liquid fuels from sunlight, water, carbon dioxide, and nitrogen. The lead institution for LiSA is the California Institute of Technology and Berkeley Lab is a major partner.
5. The Energy Storage Research Alliance (ESRA). The mission of the Energy Storage Research Alliance is to apply cutting-edge scientific tools and automation to accelerate materials discovery for next-generation energy storage technologies. Argonne National Laboratory leads the ESRA collaboration with Berkeley Lab and Pacific Northwest National Laboratory as co-leads.

=== Cyclotron Road ===
Cyclotron Road is a fellowship program for technology innovators, supporting entrepreneurial scientists as they advance their own technology projects. The core support for the program comes from the Department of Energy's Office of Energy Efficiency and Renewable Energy, through the Lab-Embedded Entrepreneurship Program. Berkeley Lab manages the program in close partnership with Activate, a nonprofit organization established to scale the Cyclotron Road fellowship model to a greater number of innovators around the U.S. and the world. Cyclotron Road fellows receive two years of stipend, over $100,000 of research support, intensive mentorship and a startup curriculum, and access to the expertise and facilities of Berkeley Lab. Since members of the first cohort completed their fellowships in 2017, the 92 start-up companies founded by Cyclotron Road Fellows have raised $4.3 billion in follow-on funding.

== Notable scientists ==
=== Nobel laureates ===
Sixteen Berkeley Lab scientists have received the Nobel Prize in physics or chemistry.

Nobel laureates
Physics	Chemistry
John Clarke (2025)	Carolyn Bertozzi (2022)
John Clauser (2022)	Jennifer Doudna (2020)
Saul Perlmutter (2011)	Yuan T. Lee (1986)
George Smoot (2006)	Melvin Calvin (1961)
Steven Chu (1997)	Edwin McMillan (1951)
Luis Alvarez (1968)	Glenn Seaborg (1951)
Donald Glaser (1960)	
Owen Chamberlain (1959)	
Emilio Segrè (1959)	
Ernest Lawrence (1939)	

=== National Medals ===
Fifteen Berkeley Lab scientists have received the National Medal of Science and three have been awarded the National Medal of Technology and Innovation.

National Medal of Science awardees
Paul Alivisatos (Chemistry, 2014)	Alexandre Chorin (Mathematics, 2012)	John Prausnitz (Engineering, 2003)
Gabor Somorjai (Chemistry, 2008)	Marvin Cohen (Physical Sciences, 2001)	Bruce Ames (Biological Sciences, 1998)
Harold Johnston (Chemistry, 1997)	Darleane Hoffman (Chemistry, 1997)	Glenn Seaborg (Chemistry, 1991)
Edwin McMillan (Physical Sciences, 1990)	Melvin Calvin (Chemistry, 1989)	Yuan T. Lee (Chemistry, 1986)
George Pimentel (Chemistry, 1983)	Kenneth Pitzer (Physical Sciences, 1974)	Luis Alvarez (Physical Sciences, 1963)

The National Medal of Technology and Innovation was awarded to Arthur Rosenfeld in 2011, to Ashok Gadgil in 2023, and to Jennifer Doudna in 2025.

== History ==
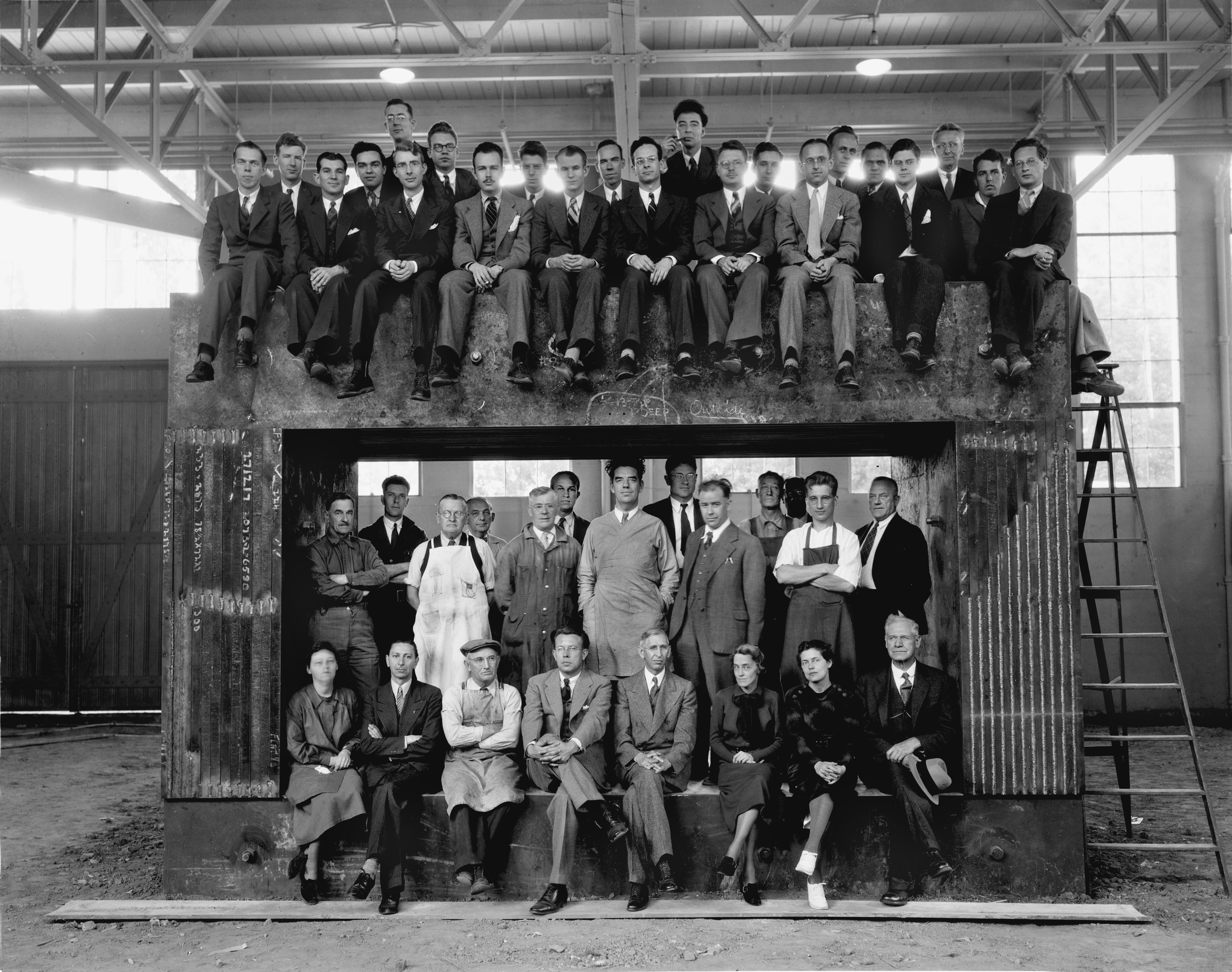
University of California Radiation Laboratory staff on the magnet yoke for the 60-inch cyclotron, 1938; Nobel prizewinners Ernest Lawrence, Edwin McMillan, and Luis Alvarez are shown, in addition to J. Robert Oppenheimer and Robert R. Wilson

=== From 1931 to 1945: cyclotrons and team science ===
The laboratory was founded on August 26, 1931, by Ernest Lawrence, as the Radiation Laboratory of the University of California, Berkeley, associated with the Physics Department. It centered physics research around his new instrument, the cyclotron, a type of particle accelerator for which he was awarded the Nobel Prize in Physics in 1939. Throughout the 1930s, Lawrence pushed to create larger and larger machines for physics research, courting private philanthropists for funding. He was the first to develop a large team to build big projects to make discoveries in basic research. Eventually these machines grew too large to be held on the university grounds, and in 1940 the lab moved to its current site atop the hill above campus. Part of the team put together during this period includes two other young scientists who went on to direct large laboratories: J. Robert Oppenheimer, who directed Los Alamos Laboratory, and Robert Wilson, who directed Fermilab.

Leslie Groves visited Lawrence's Radiation Laboratory in late 1942 as he was organizing the Manhattan Project, meeting J. Robert Oppenheimer for the first time. Oppenheimer was tasked with organizing the nuclear bomb development effort and founded today's Los Alamos National Laboratory to help keep the work secret. At the RadLab, Lawrence and his colleagues developed the technique of electromagnetic enrichment of uranium using their experience with cyclotrons. The calutrons (named after the university) became the basic unit of the massive Y-12 facility in Oak Ridge, Tennessee. Lawrence's lab helped contribute to what have been judged to be the three most valuable technology developments of the war (the atomic bomb, proximity fuze, and radar). The cyclotron, whose construction was stalled during the war, was finished in November 1946. The Manhattan Project shut down two months later.

=== From 1946 to 1972: discovering the antiproton and new elements ===
After the war, the Radiation Laboratory became one of the first laboratories to be incorporated into the Atomic Energy Commission (AEC) (now Department of Energy, DOE). In 1952, the Laboratory established a branch in Livermore focused on nuclear security work, which developed into Lawrence Livermore National Laboratory. Some classified research continued at Berkeley Lab until the 1970s, when it became a laboratory dedicated only to unclassified scientific research. Much of the Laboratory's scientific leadership during this period were also faculty members in the Physics and Chemistry Departments at the University of California, Berkeley.

The scientists and engineers at Berkeley Lab continued to build ambitious large projects to accelerate the advance of science. Lawrence's original cyclotron design did not work for particles near the speed of light, so a new approach was needed. Edwin McMillan co-invented the synchrotron with Vladimir Veksler to address the problem. McMillan built an electron synchrotron capable of accelerating electrons to 300 million electron volts (300 MeV), which was operated from 1948 to 1960.

The Berkeley accelerator team built the Bevatron, a proton synchrotron capable of accelerating protons to an energy of 6.5 gigaelectronvolts (GeV), an energy chosen to be just above the threshold for producing antiprotons. In 1955, during the Bevatron's first full year of operation, Physicists Emilio Segrè and Owen Chamberlain won the competition to observe the antiprotons for the first time. They won the Nobel Prize for Physics in 1959 for this discovery. The Bevatron remained the highest energy accelerator until the CERN Proton Synchrotron started accelerating protons to 25 GeV in 1959.

Luis Alvarez led the design and construction of several liquid hydrogen bubble chambers, which were used to discover a large number of new elementary particles using Bevatron beams. His group also developed measuring systems to record the millions of photographs of particle tracks in the bubble chamber and computer systems to analyze the data. Alvarez won the Nobel Prize for Physics in 1968 for the discovery of many elementary particles using this technique.

The Alvarez Physics Memos are a set of informal working papers of the large group of physicists, engineers, computer programmers, and technicians led by Luis W. Alvarez from the early 1950s until his death in 1988. Over 1700 memos are available on-line, hosted by the Laboratory.

Berkeley Lab is credited with the discovery of 16 elements on the periodic table, more than any other institution, over the period 1940 to 1974. The American Chemical Society has established a National Historical Chemical Landmark at the Lab to memorialize this accomplishment. Glenn Seaborg was personally involved in discovering nine of these new elements, and he won the Nobel Prize for Chemistry in 1951 with McMillan.

Founding Laboratory Director Lawrence died in 1958 at the age of 57. McMillan became the second Director, serving in that role until 1972.

=== From 1973 to 1989: new capabilities in energy and environmental research ===
The University of California appointed Andrew Sessler as the Laboratory Director in 1973, during the 1973 oil crisis. He established the Energy and Environment Division at the Lab, expanding for the first time into applied research that addressed the energy and environmental challenges the country faced. Sessler also joined with other Berkeley physicists to form an organization called Scientists for Sakharov, Orlov, Sharansky (SOS), which led an international protest movement calling attention to the plight of three Soviet scientists who were being persecuted by the U.S.S.R. government.

Arthur Rosenfeld led the campaign to build up applied energy research at Berkeley Lab. He became widely known as the father of energy efficiency and the person who convinced the nation to adopt energy standards for appliances and buildings. Inspired by the 1973 oil crisis, he started up large team efforts that developed several technologies that radically improved energy efficiency. These included compact fluorescent lamps, low-energy refrigerators, and windows that trap heat. He developed the first energy-efficiency standards for buildings and appliances in California, which helped the state to sustain constant electricity use per capita from 1973 to 2006, while it rose by 50% in the rest of the country. This phenomenon is called the Rosenfeld Effect.

By 1980, George Smoot had built up a strong experimental group in Berkeley, building instruments to measure the cosmic microwave background (CMB) in order to study the early universe. He became the principal investigator for the Differential Microwave Radiometer (DMR) instrument that was launched in 1989 as part of the Cosmic Background Explorer (COBE) mission. The full sky maps taken by the DMR made it possible for COBE scientists to discover the anisotropy of the CMB, and Smoot shared the Nobel Prize for Physics in 2006 with John Mather.

=== From 1990 to 2004: new facilities for chemistry and materials, nanotechnology, scientific computing, and genomics ===
Charles V. Shank left Bell Labs to become Director of Berkeley Lab in 1989, a position he held for 15 years. During his tenure, four of the five national scientific user facilities started operations at Berkeley, and the fifth started construction.

On October 5, 1993, the new Advanced Light Source produced its first beams of x-ray light. David Shirley had proposed in the early 1990s building this new synchrotron source specializing in imaging materials using extreme ultraviolet to soft x-rays. In fall 2001, a major upgrade added "superbends" to produce harder x-rays for beamlines devoted to protein crystallography.

In 1996, both the National Energy Research Scientific Computing Center (NERSC) and the Energy Sciences Network (ESnet) were moved from Lawrence Livermore National Laboratory to their new home at Berkeley Lab. To reestablish NERSC at Berkeley required moving a Cray C90, a first-generation vector processor supercomputer of 1991 vintage, and installing a new Cray T3E, the second-generation (1995) model. The NERSC computing capacity was 350 GFlop/s, representing 1/200,000 of the Perlmutter's speed in 2022. Horst D. Simon was brought to Berkeley as the first Director of NERSC, and he soon became one of the co-editors who managed the Top500 list of supercomputers, a position he has held ever since.

The Joint Genome Institute (JGI) was created in 1997 to unite the expertise and resources in genome mapping, DNA sequencing, technology development, and information sciences that had developed at the DOE genome centers at Berkeley Lab, Lawrence Livermore National Laboratory (LLNL) and Los Alamos National Laboratory (LANL). The JGI was originally established to work on the Human Genome Project (HGP), and generated the complete sequences of Chromosomes 5, 16 and 19. In 2004, the JGI established itself as a national user facility managed by Berkeley Lab, focusing on the broad genomic needs of biology and biotechnology, especially those related to the environment and carbon management.

Laboratory Director Shank brought Daniel Chemla from Bell Labs to Berkeley Lab in 1991 to lead the newly formed Division of Materials Science and Engineering. In 1998 Chemla was appointed director of the Advanced Light Source to build it into a world-class scientific user facility. In 2001, Chemla proposed the establishment of the Molecular Foundry, to make cutting-edge instruments and expertise for nanotechnology accessible to a broad research community. Paul Alivisatos as founding director, and the founding directors of the facilities were Carolyn Bertozzi, Jean Frechet, Steven Gwon Sheng Louie, Jeffrey Bokor, and Miquel Salmeron. The Molecular Foundry building was dedicated in 2006, with Bertozzi as Foundry Director and Steven Chu as Laboratory Director.

In the 1990s, Saul Perlmutter led the Supernova Cosmology Project (SCP), which used a certain type of supernovas as standard candles to study the expansion of the universe. The SCP team co-discovered the accelerating expansion of the universe, leading to the concept of dark energy, an unknown form of energy that drives this acceleration. Perlmutter shared the Nobel Prize in Physics in 2011 for this discovery.

=== From 2005 to 2015: advancing the national needs for energy ===
On August 1, 2004, Nobel-winning physicist Steven Chu was named the sixth Director of Berkeley Lab. The DOE was preparing to compete the management and operations (M&O) contract for Berkeley Lab for the first time, and Chu's first task was to lead the University of California's team that successfully bid for that contract. The initial term of the contract was from June 1, 2005, to May 31, 2010, with possible phased extensions for superior management performance up to a total contract term of 20 years.

In 2007, Berkeley Lab launched the Joint BioEnergy Institute, one of three Bioenergy Research Centers to receive funding from the Genomic Science Program of DOE's Office for Biological and Environmental Research (BER). JBEI's Chief Executive Officer is Jay Keasling, who was elected a member of the National Academy of Engineering for developing synthetic biology tools needed to engineer the antimalarial drug artemisinin. The DOE Office of Science named Keasling a Distinguished Scientist Fellow in 2021 for advancing the DOE's strategy in biotechnology.

On December 15, 2008, newly elected President Barack Obama nominated Steven Chu to be the Secretary of Energy. The University of California chose the Lab's Deputy Director, Paul Alivisatos, as the new director. Alivisatos is a materials chemist who won the National Medal of Science for his pioneering work in developing nanomaterials. He continued the Lab's focus on meeting the nation's energy needs.

The DOE established the Joint Center for Artificial Photosynthesis (JCAP) as an Energy Innovation Hub in 2010, with California Institute of Technology as the lead institution and Berkeley Lab as the lead partner. The Lab built a new facility to house the JCAP laboratories and collaborative research space, and it was dedicated as Chu Hall in 2015. After JCAP operated for ten years, in 2020 the Berkeley team became a major partner in a new Energy Innovation Hub, the Liquid Sunlight Alliance (LiSA), with the vision of establishing the science needed to generate liquid fuels economically from sunlight, water, carbon dioxide and nitrogen.

The Lab also is a major partner on a second Energy Innovation Hub, the Joint Center for Energy Storage Research (JCESR) which was started in 2013, with Argonne National Laboratory as the lead institution. The Lab built a new facility, the General Purpose Laboratory, to house energy storage laboratories and associated research space, which Secretary of Energy Ernest Moniz inaugurated in 2014. The mission of JCESR is to deliver transformational new concepts and materials that will enable a diversity of high performance next-generation batteries for transportation and the grid.

On November 12, 2015, Laboratory Director Paul Alivisatos and Deputy Director Horst Simon were joined by University of California President Janet Napolitano, UC Berkeley Chancellor Nicholas Dirks, and the head of DOE's ASCR program Barb Helland to dedicate a Shyh Wang Hall, a facility designed to host the NERSC supercomputers and staff, the ESnet staff, and the research divisions in the Computing Sciences area. The building was designed with a novel seismic floor for the 20,000 square foot machine room in addition to features that take advantage of the coastal climate to provide energy-efficient air conditioning for the computing systems.

=== From 2016 to the present: building new scientific facilities and accelerating research with AI ===
In 2015 Paul Alivisatos announced that he was stepping down from his role as Laboratory Director. He took two leadership positions at the University of California, Berkeley, before becoming President of the University of Chicago in 2021. The University of California selected Michael Witherell, formerly the Director of Fermilab and Vice Chancellor for Research at the University of California, Santa Barbara as the eighth director of Berkeley Lab starting on March 1, 2016. In 2016, the Laboratory entered a period of intensive modernization: an unprecedented number of major projects to upgrade existing scientific facilities and to build new ones.

Berkeley Lab physicists led the construction of the Dark Energy Spectroscopic Instrument, which is designed to create three-dimensional maps of the distribution of matter covering an unprecedented volume of the universe with unparalleled detail. The new instrument was installed on the retrofitted Nicholas U. Mayall 4-meter Telescope at Kitt Peak National Observatory in 2019. The five-year mission started in 2021, and the map assembled with data taken in the first seven months already included more galaxies than any previous survey. When the DESI survey's results from the first three years of observation are combined with other cosmological measurements, there is evidence that the acceleration of the universe's expansion caused by dark energy has changed with time.

On September 27, 2016, The DOE gave approval of the mission need for ALS-U, a major project to upgrade the Advanced Light Source that includes constructing a new storage ring and an accumulator ring. The horizontal size of the electron beam in ALS will shrink from 100 micrometers to a few micrometers, which will improve the ability to image novel materials needed for next-generation batteries and electronics.

==== The Genesis Mission ====
Berkeley Lab has a major role in the Genesis Mission, a national initiative led by the Department of Energy to use artificial intelligence to accelerate scientific discovery and to deliver solutions to national challenges in science, energy, and national security. When Under Secretary Dario Gil briefed the House Committee on Science, Space and Technology about the Genesis Mission on December 10, 2025, he cited the Doudna supercomputer, to be installed at NERSC in 2026, as a central element of the computing infrastructure for Genesis.

Berkeley Lab researchers are participating in several early Genesis projects which apply AI to a wide range of research topics: particle accelerators, X-ray user facilities, biotechnology, critical minerals and materials, cosmology, microelectronics, and quantum algorithms. On February 12, 2026, the Department of Energy published a list of National Science and Technology Challenges for the Genesis Mission. Several of these challenges list specifically Berkeley Lab assets in the justification section. The challenge titled "Scaling the Biotechnology Revolution" lists two Berkeley Lab assets: the Joint Genome Institute and the Advanced Biofuels and Bioproducts Process Development Unit. "Securing U.S. Leadership in Data Centers" refers to the Center of Expertise for Data Center Energy at LBNL. Finally, "Unleashing subsurface Strategic Energy Assets" mentions LBNL's Transport Of Unsaturated Groundwater and Heat (TOUGH) simulation suite as an asset.

=== How the Lab's name evolved ===
Shortly after the death of Lawrence in August 1958, the UC Radiation Laboratory (UCRL), including both the Berkeley and Livermore sites, was renamed Lawrence Radiation Laboratory. The Berkeley location became Lawrence Berkeley Laboratory in 1971, although many continued to call it the RadLab. Gradually, another shortened form came into common usage, LBL. Its formal name was amended to Ernest Orlando Lawrence Berkeley National Laboratory in 1995, when "National" was added to the names of all DOE labs. "Ernest Orlando" was later dropped to shorten the name. Today, the lab is commonly referred to as Berkeley Lab.

== Laboratory directors ==
Since its founding in 1931, Lawrence Berkeley National Laboratory has been led by 8 directors.

No.	Image	Director	Term start	Term end	Refs.
1		Ernest Lawrence	1931	1958	
2		Edwin McMillan	1958	1972	
3		Andrew Sessler	1973	1980	
4		David Shirley	1980	1989	
5		Charles V. Shank	September 1, 1989	July 31, 2004	
6		Steven Chu	August 1, 2004	January 21, 2009	
Interim		Paul Alivisatos	January 21, 2009	November 19, 2009	
7		Paul Alivisatos	November 19, 2009	January 21, 2016	
8		Michael Witherell	January 21, 2016	June 30, 2026	
9		Katherine Yelick	July 1, 2026	Present	

== Operations and governance ==
The University of California operates Lawrence Berkeley National Laboratory under a contract with the Department of Energy. The site consists of 76 buildings (owned by the U.S. Department of Energy) located on 200 acres (0.81 km^{2}) owned by the university in the Berkeley Hills. Altogether, the Lab has 3,663 UC employees, of whom about 800 are students or postdocs, and each year it hosts more than 3,000 participating guest scientists. There are approximately two dozen DOE employees stationed at the laboratory to provide federal oversight of Berkeley Lab's work for the DOE. The laboratory director, Michael Witherell, is appointed by the university regents and reports to the university president. In December 2024, the Department of Energy extended the University of California's contract to manage the Laboratory through June 1, 2030.

Although Berkeley Lab is governed by UC independently of the Berkeley campus, the two entities are closely interconnected; more than 200 Berkeley Lab researchers hold joint appointments as UC Berkeley faculty.

The laboratory budget was $1.495 billion in fiscal year 2023, while the total obligations were $1.395 billion.

== See also ==
- Lawrence Livermore National Laboratory
