= Accelerator Test Facility (New York) =

The Accelerator Test Facility (BNL-ATF) is a user facility within the Brookhaven National Laboratory (BNL) in New York, USA, as part of the Science Accelerator Stewardship. Commencing operation in 1992, the BNL-ATF carries out research and development in collaboration with other labs around the world on advanced accelerator physics and studies the interactions of high-power electromagnetic radiation and high-brightness electron beams, including plasma-acceleration and laser-acceleration of electrons.
