= Angströmquelle Karlsruhe =

Synchrotron light source facility in Karlsruhe, Germany

Coordinates: 49.0967°N 8.4283°E

ANKA (an abbreviation for "Angströmquelle Karlsruhe") is a synchrotron light source facility at the Karlsruhe Institute of Technology (KIT) in Karlsruhe, Germany. In 2016, the facility was renamed Karlsruhe Research Accelerator (KARA) as part of the Institute for Beam Physics and Technology. The KIT runs ANKA as a national synchrotron light source and as a large-scale user facility for the international science community. Being a large-scale machine in the performance category LK II of the Helmholtz Association of German Research Centres, ANKA is part of a national and European infrastructure offering research services to scientific and commercial users for their purposes in research and development. The facility was opened to external users in 2003.

== History ==
Planning began in 1997 to build ANKA on the premises of the former Research Center Karlsruhe. By the end of 1998, the outer structure was erected, and in 1999, the first electrons were inducted into the storage ring. After further machine and laboratory development, in March 2003 ANKA opened its doors to users from the science community and industry. It initially featured seven beamlines: six analytical ones and one for the generation of microstructures using X-ray lithography. After improvements and extensions, 15 beamlines are now in operation, with 3 more under installation. The machine itself has seen several updated generations of its insertion devices (undulators and wigglers) that were in part developed at ANKA. The facility also provides infrastructure support, such as apartments on the premises of the KIT Campus North that can be booked by external ANKA users.

== Technical details ==
ANKA features a storage ring with a circumference of 110.4 m (120.7 yards) that stores electrons at an energy of 2.5 GeV. For this purpose, electrons at 90 keV are generated by a triode and preaccelerated to 500 MeV via a “racetrack microtron” (53 MeV) and a booster. The final working energy is reached in the storage ring, where the electrons are spinning at almost the speed of light. The storage ring contains an ultra-high vacuum of 10^{−9} mbar.

The electrons are confined by the constant deflection of 16 magnets that keep the electrons focused in the center of the tube. Synchrotron light is then generated wigglers and undulators — specialized magnet configurations with alternating straight and reverse polarity — that deflect the electrons into the sine-curve-like course on which they emit synchrotron radiation. A special feature of the ANKA synchrotron configuration is the superconducting SCU15 undulator, which was, like its predecessor SCU14, co-developed at ANKA. This new undulator not only generates synchrotron light of enhanced brilliance, but also produces a more variable spectrum of radiation easily adjustable to the respective research requirements.

== ANKA beamlines and their applications ==
=== Imaging methods ===
IMAGE
Use of X-rays for imaging procedures in 2D and 3D fields, static as well as dynamic
MPI-MF
Run by the Max Planck Institute for Intelligent Systems, specialized for in situ analyses of interfaces and thin films
NANO
High definition in-situ X-ray diffraction (in the final phase of installation)
PDIFF
Analysis using Debye-Scherrer powder diffraction for examination and identification of crystalline substances in powdered samples
SCD
Analysis of X-ray diffraction on single crystals
TOPO-TOMO
Topography, microradiology and microtomography using polychromatic light and X-rays

=== Spectroscopy ===
FLUO
X-ray fluorescence spectroscopy, non-destructive qualitative and quantitative identification of the elemental composition of a sample
INE
Installed and conducted by the KIT Institute for Nuclear Waste Disposal for actinide research
IR1
Infrared spectroscopy and infrared ellipsometry including terahertz radiation
IR2
Infrared spectroscopy and infrared microscopy including terahertz radiation
SUL-X
Absorption, fluorescence and diffraction analysis as part of the synchrotron environmental laboratory
UV-CD12
Conducted by the KIT Institute for Biological Interfaces, UV circular dichroism spectroscopy (structural analysis of biological substances)
WERA
Soft X-ray analysis conducted by the KIT Institute for Solid State Physics
XAS
X-ray absorption spectroscopy, XANES (chemical composition of a sample) and EXAFS (number, distance and type of neighboring atom (also in non-crystalline form)

=== Microfabrication ===
LIGA I, II, III
Deep X-ray lithography according to the LIGA procedure developed at the KIT. The three beamlines differ regarding the level of available energy

== Access for scientific users ==
Besides the scientists at ANKA and IPS who contribute to the development of the synchrotron and its components, external users have the opportunity to use the radiation generated at ANKA for their own research projects. Use by the international science community is coordinated by ANKA's user office. Twice a year, proposals for beamtime at ANKA are collected via an online application procedure. The beamtime is then allocated by an international scientific committee that evaluates the submitted proposals. On the premises of KIT Campus North, a guest house accommodates external users during their time at ANKA.
