= Halbach =

Halbach is a surname. Notable people with the surname include:

- Arnold Halbach (1787–1869), Prussian diplomat
- Edward A. Halbach (1909–2011), American amateur astronomer
- Klaus Halbach (1925–2000), German-born American physicist
- Alfried Krupp von Bohlen und Halbach (1907–1967), German steel entrepreneur

== See also ==
- Bohlen § von Bohlen und Halbach
