= Klaus Halbach =

German-American physicist and engineer (1925-2000)

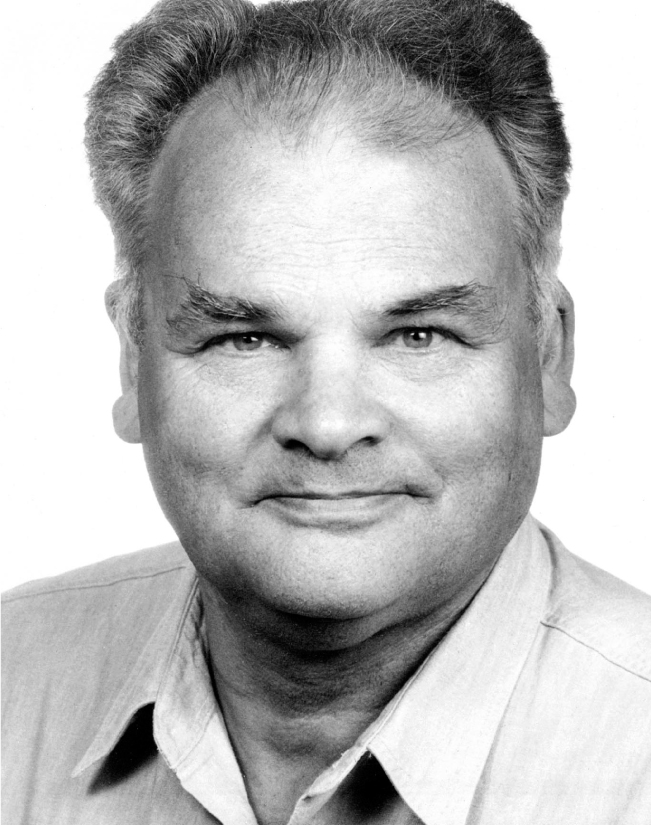
- Halbach c. 1980s
- Born: February 3, 1925; Wuppertal, Weimar Republic
- Died: May 11, 2000 (aged 75); Berkeley, California, U.S.
- Education: University of Basel
- Known for: Halbach array
- Scientific career
- Fields: Accelerator physics, nuclear physics
- Workplaces: University of Fribourg; Stanford University; Lawrence Berkeley National Laboratory
- Thesis: Über eine neue Methode zur Messung von Relaxationszeiten und über den Spin von Cr^{53} (1954)

Klaus Halbach (February 3, 1925 – May 11, 2000) was a German-born American applied physicist, engineer and inventor, who was a staff scientist at Lawrence Berkeley National Laboratory. He is best known for his contributions to magnetic system designs for accelerators and nuclear instrumentation. The Halbach array is named after him.

== Biography ==
Klaus Halbach was born on February 3, 1925 in Wuppertal, Weimar Republic. After joining the Luftwaffe in 1943, he trained as a fighter plot, although he never saw combat. Relocating to Grenzach-Wyhlen following the bombing of Wuppertal in World War II, he married Ruth Halbach in 1945. He was captured as a prisoner of war near Munich in the same year, and returned to Grenzach following his release.

He received a PhD degree in nuclear physics from the University of Basel in 1954, after which he has worked as an instructor at University of Fribourg for three years. His PhD studies concerned the newly-emerging area of nuclear magnetic resonance; his work brought him into contact with Felix Bloch, who received 1952 Nobel Prize in Physics for his contributions to this field. In 1957, he came to the United States under a Swiss National Science Foundation grant to work at Stanford University as a research associate under Bloch. Following his work at Stanford University, he briefly returned to University of Fribourg to start a plasma physics group. In 1960, he joined the fusion research group at Lawrence Berkeley National Laboratory, where he spent the remainder of his professional career.

During his tenure, he has made contributions the design of the synchrotron Omnitron, which formed the basis of Bevalac. Working on numerous accelerator designs, he is best known for his contributions to the design of magnetic systems such as wigglers and undulators. Halbach and his colleague (and son-in-law) Ron Holsinger developed the widely-used POISSON package of simulation software for magnetic system design. He also contributed to the development of other accelerator design software, such as PANDIRA, used for certain magnet designs, and SUPERFISH, used for microwave cavities. In the late 1970s, he proposed a permanent magnet array configuration for obtaining multipole magnetic fields; this configuration, known as Halbach array, is widely used in different devices in addition to accelerators, such as permanent magnet motors and MRI machines.

Despite his official retirement from Lawrence Berkeley National Laboratory in 1991, he continued his research on magnet design and trained students in his field. In 1995, a symposium on magnet technology was held by Lawrence Berkeley National Laboratory in honor of his 70th birthday. He died on May 11, 2000 in Berkeley, California, due to complications from prostate cancer. He was survived by his wife Ruth Halbach, daughter, and three grandchildren.

== Selected publications ==
=== Journal articles ===
- Halbach, K. (August 1960). "Modulation-effect corrections for moments of magnetic resonance line shapes". Physical Review. 119 (4): 1230. Bibcode:1960PhRv..119.1230H. doi:10.1103/PhysRev.119.1230.
- Halbach, K. (February 1964). "Matrix representation of Gaussian optics" (PDF). American Journal of Physics. 32 (2): 90–108. Bibcode:1964AmJPh..32...90H. doi:10.1119/1.1970159.
- Halbach, K. (June 1979). "Strong rare earth cobalt quadrupoles". IEEE Transactions on Nuclear Science. 26 (3): 3882–3884. Bibcode:1979ITNS...26.3882H. doi:10.1109/TNS.1979.4330638.
- Halbach, K. (February 1980). "Design of permanent multipole magnets with oriented rare earth cobalt material". Nuclear Instruments and Methods. 169 (1): 1–10. Bibcode:1980NucIM.169....1H. doi:10.1016/0029-554X(80)90094-4.
- Halbach, K. (August 1981). "Physical and optical properties of rare earth cobalt magnets". Nuclear Instruments and Methods in Physics Research. 187 (1): 109–117. Bibcode:1981NIMPR.187..109H. doi:10.1016/0029-554X(81)90477-8.
- Halbach, K. (April 1985). "Application of permanent magnets in accelerators and electron storage rings". Journal of Applied Physics. 57: 3605–3608. doi:10.1063/1.335021.

=== Reports ===
- K. Halbach (February 1995). The Art and Science of Magnet Design: Volume 2, Selected Notes of Klaus Halbach (Report). University of California, Berkeley.
