= Hans Motz =

Hans Motz (1 October 1909 – 6 August 1987) is known for his pioneering work at Stanford University on undulators which led to the development of the wiggler and the free-electron laser.

Hans Motz was born in Vienna, and died in Oxford, England. He was survived by his widow Lotte Motz, his daughter Anna Motz, and his protégé of many years, George B. Purdy.

On October 19, 1942, he spoke on the topic "Is a 'Mechanistic' View of the Universe Scientifically Tenable?" at the Socratic Club in Oxford. In 1958 he was the Donald Pollock Reader in the Department of Engineering at Oxford University and also a member of St Catherine's Society, Oxford, which became St Catherine's College, Oxford in 1962, at which time he became a Fellow. In 1977 he became the only Full Professor (at that time) in the Department of Engineering.

He has written a number of books, including The Physics of Laser Fusion, and a book on microwave theory. He is also a coauthor with Paolo Luchini of the book Undulators and Free-electron Lasers.

In the early 1960s he had a grant from Rand corporation to see how much classified nuclear physics he could rediscover using an electronic computer. There was a feeling that freer access would allow the US nuclear power industry to develop more quickly. Using Oxford University's Feranti Mercury computer he was able to rediscover essentially all of the basics, and these were subsequently declassified and taught in university nuclear engineering programs.
