= Bohlen (disambiguation) =

Bohlen may refer to:

- Bohlen, a surname
- Böhlen, a town in Saxony, Germany
- Böhlen, Thuringia, a municipality in Thuringia, Germany
- D.A. Bohlen & Son, architectural firm in Indianapolis, Indiana
