= Insertion device =

Component of synchrotron light sources

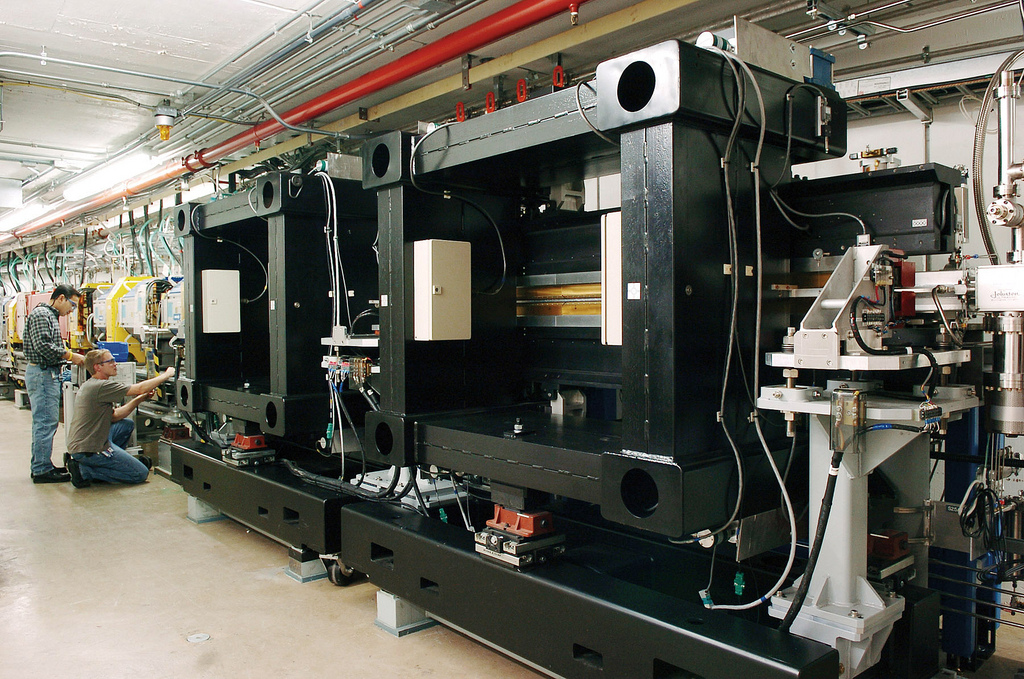
Canted insertion device at the Advanced Photon Source, Argonne National Laboratory.

An insertion device (ID) is a component in modern synchrotron light sources, so called because they are "inserted" into accelerator tracks. They are periodic magnetic structures that stimulate highly brilliant, forward-directed synchrotron radiation emission by forcing a stored charged particle beam to perform wiggles, or undulations, as they pass through the device. This motion is caused by the Lorentz force, and it is from this oscillatory motion that we get the names for the two classes of device, which are known as wigglers and undulators. As well as creating a brighter light, some insertion devices enable tuning of the light so that different frequencies can be generated for different applications.

== History ==
The theory behind undulators was developed by Vitaly Ginzburg in the USSR. However it was Motz and his team who in 1953 installed the first undulator in a linac at Stanford, using it to generate millimetre wave radiation through to visible light.

It was not until the 1970s that undulators were installed in electron storage rings to produce synchrotron radiation. The first institutions to take these devices were the Lebedev Physical Institute in Moscow, and the Tomsk Polytechnic University. These installations allowed a fuller characterisation of the behaviour of undulators.

Undulators only became practical devices for insertion in synchrotron light sources in 1981, when teams at the Lawrence Berkeley National Laboratory (LBNL), Stanford Synchrotron Radiation Laboratory (SSRL), and at Budker Institute of Nuclear Physics (BINP) in Russia developed permanent magnetic arrays, known as Halbach arrays, which allowed short repeating periods unachievable with either electromagnetic coils or superconducting coils.

Despite their similar function, wigglers were used in storage rings for over a decade before they were used to generate synchrotron radiation for beamlines. Wigglers have a damping effect on storage rings, which is the function to which they first put at the Cambridge Electron Accelerator in Massachusetts in 1966. The first wiggler used for generation of synchrotron radiation was a 7 pole wiggler installed in the SSRL in 1979.

Since these first insertions the number of undulators and wigglers in synchrotron radiation facilities throughout the world have proliferated and they are one of the driving technologies behind the next generation of light sources, free electron lasers.

Schematic sketch of an undulator

== Operation ==
Insertion devices are traditionally inserted into straight sections of storage rings (hence their name). As the stored particle beam, usually electrons, pass through the ID the alternating magnetic field experienced by the particles causes their trajectory to undergo a transverse oscillation. The acceleration associated with this movement stimulates the emission of synchrotron radiation.

There is very little mechanical difference between wigglers and undulators and the criterion normally used to distinguish between them is the K-Factor. The K-factor is a dimensionless constant defined as:

$K=\frac{q B \lambda_u}{2 \pi \beta m c}$

where q is the charge of the particle passing through the ID, B is the peak magnetic field of the ID, $\lambda_u$ is the period of the ID, $\beta=v/c$ relates to the speed, or energy of the particle, m is the mass of the accelerated particle, and c is the speed of light.

Wigglers are deemed to have K>>1 and undulators to have K<1.

The K-Factor determines the energy of radiation produced, and in situations where a range of energy is required the K-number can be modified by varying the strength of the magnetic field of the device. In permanent magnet devices this is usually done by increasing the gap between the magnet arrays. In electromagnetic devices the magnetic field is changed by varying the current in the magnet coils.

In a wiggler the period and the strength of the magnetic field is not tuned to the frequency of radiation produced by the electrons. Thus every electron in a bunch radiates independently, and the resulting radiation bandwidth is broad. A wiggler can be considered to be series of bending magnets concatenated together, and its radiation intensity scales as the number of magnetic poles in the wiggler.

In an undulator source the radiation produced by the oscillating electrons interferes constructively with the motion of other electrons, causing the radiation spectrum to have a relatively narrow bandwidth. The intensity of radiation scales as $N^2$, where $N$ is the number of poles in the magnet array.

The wavelength $\lambda$ of the radiation emitted by an insertion device can be calculated using the undulator equation:

$$\lambda =  \frac{\lambda_u}{2 \gamma^2} \left(1 + \frac{K^2}{2} + (\theta \gamma)^2 \right)$$

where $\gamma = \frac{1}{\sqrt{1-\beta^2}}$ is the Lorentz factor, $\lambda_u$ the undulation period, K the K-factor as described above, and $\theta$ the angle measured from the center of the radiated lobe.

Despite its name the equation holds true for both undulators and wigglers.
