= Bohlen =

Bohlen is a surname shared by several notable people, among them being:

Bohlen

- Avis Bohlen (born 1940), American diplomat
- Charles E. Bohlen (1904–1974), American diplomat
- Dieter Bohlen (born 1954), German musician
- Francis Bohlen (1868–1942), American Algernon Sydney Biddle professor of law at the University of Pennsylvania Law School
- Henry Bohlen (1810–1862), German-American who became a Union general during the American Civil War
- Jim Bohlen (1926–2010), American-born Canadian political activist

von Bohlen

- Davey von Bohlen (born 1975), American musician

van Bohlen

- Peter van Bohlen (1796–1840), German academic

von Bohlen und Halbach

- Alfried Krupp von Bohlen und Halbach (1907–1967), German industrialist
- Arndt von Bohlen und Halbach (1938–1986), German entrepreneur
- Gustav von Bohlen und Halbach (1831–1890), American-born German diplomat, court master and minister resident
- Gustav Krupp von Bohlen und Halbach (1870–1950), German industrialist

== See also ==
- Information about von and van in human names: Von, Van (Dutch), Tussenvoegsel
