= Synchrotron light source =

Particle accelerator designed to produce intense x-ray beams

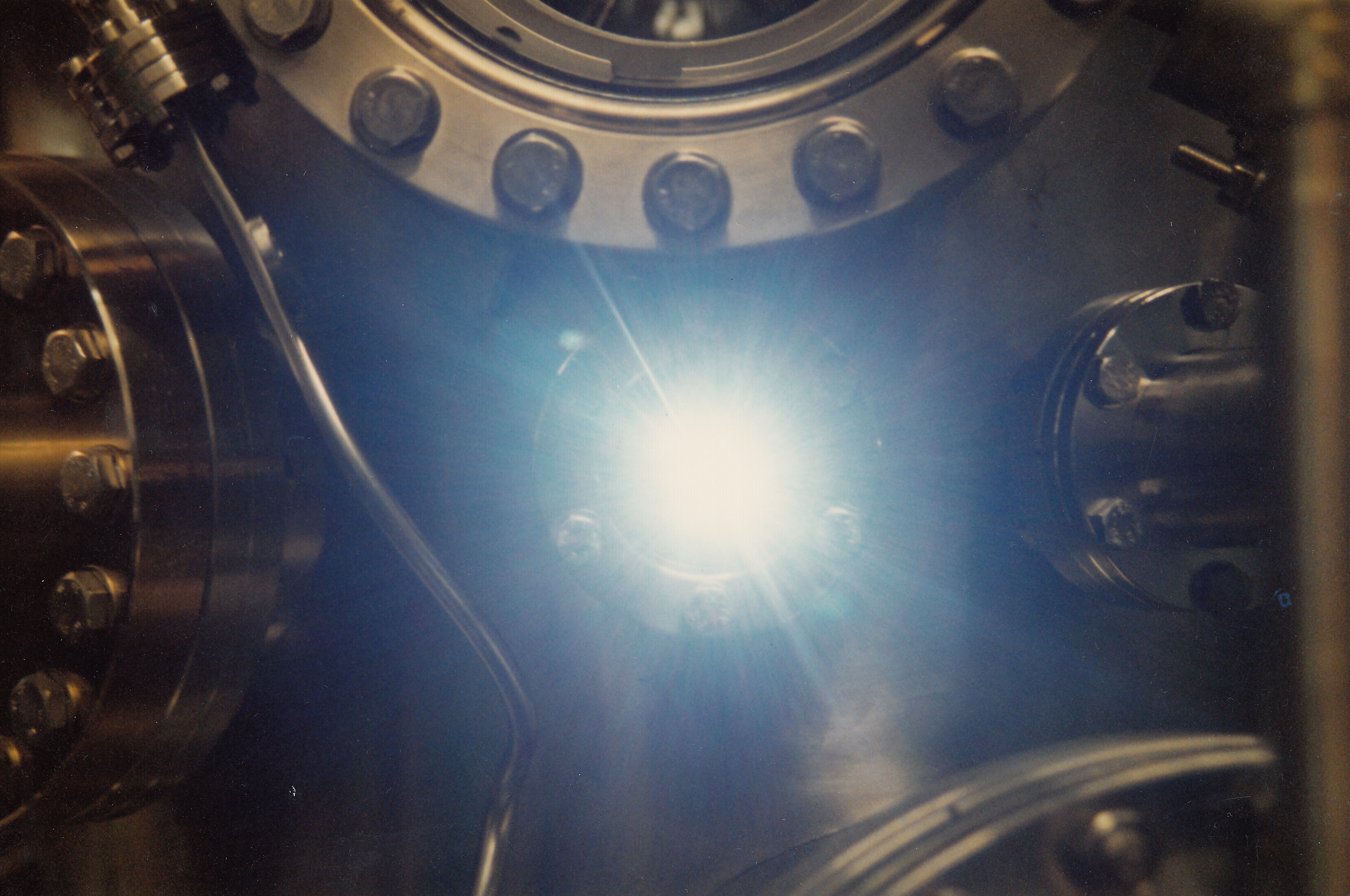
Synchrotron radiation reflecting from a terbium crystal at the Daresbury Synchrotron Radiation Source, 1990

A synchrotron light source is a source of electromagnetic radiation (EM) usually produced by a storage ring, for scientific and technical purposes. First observed in synchrotrons, synchrotron light is now produced by storage rings and other specialized particle accelerators, typically accelerating electrons. Once the high-energy electron beam has been generated, it is directed into auxiliary components such as bending magnets and insertion devices (undulators or wigglers) in storage rings and free electron lasers. These supply the strong magnetic fields perpendicular to the beam that are needed to stimulate the high energy electrons to emit photons.

The major applications of synchrotron light are in condensed matter physics, materials science, biology and medicine. A large fraction of experiments using synchrotron light involve probing the structure of matter from the sub-nanometer level of electronic structure to the micrometer and millimeter levels important in medical imaging. An example of a practical industrial application is the manufacturing of microstructures by the LIGA process.

Synchrotron is one of the most expensive kinds of light source known, but it is practically the only viable luminous source of wide-band radiation in far infrared wavelength range for some applications, such as far-infrared absorption spectrometry.

== Spectral brightness ==
The primary figure of merit used to compare different sources of synchrotron radiation has been referred to as the "brightness", the "brilliance", and the "spectral brightness", with the latter term being recommended as the best choice by the Working Group on Synchrotron Nomenclature. Regardless of the name chosen, the term is a measure of the total flux of photons in a given six-dimensional phase space per unit bandwidth (BW).

The spectral brightness is given by

$$B = \frac{\dot N_\text{ph}}{4 \pi^2 \sigma_x \sigma_y \sigma_{x'} \sigma_{y'} \frac{d\omega}{\omega}},$$

where $\dot N_\text{ph}$ is the number of photons per second in the beam, $\sigma_x$ and $\sigma_y$ are the root mean square values for the size of the beam in the axes perpendicular to the beam direction, $\sigma_{x'}$ and $\sigma_{y'}$ are the RMS values for the beam solid angle in the x and y dimensions, and $\frac{d\omega}{\omega}$ is the relative bandwidth, or spread in beam frequency around the central frequency. The customary value for bandwidth is 0.1%.

Spectral brightness has units of time^{−1}⋅distance^{−2}⋅angle^{−2}⋅(% bandwidth)^{−1}.

== Properties of synchrotron light sources ==
Especially when artificially produced, synchrotron radiation is notable for its:

- High intensity and brilliance, many orders of magnitude higher than with X-rays produced in conventional X-ray tubes: 3rd-generation sources typically have a brilliance larger than 10^{18} photons·s^{−1}·mm^{−2}·mrad^{−2}/(0.1%BW), where 0.1%BW denotes a bandwidth 10^{−3}ω centered around the frequency ω.
- High level of polarization (linear, elliptical or circular).
- High collimation, i.e. highly focused and narrow beam of high-energy particles.
- Low emittance, i.e. very small and tightly-focused cross-section and solid angle of emission.
- Wide tunability in energy/wavelength by monochromatization, i.e. ability to tune an intense beam of light at a desired energy/wavelength (sub-electronvolt up to the megaelectronvolt range)
- Pulsed light emission (pulse durations at or below one nanosecond, or a billionth of a second): known as "bunches" within the storage ring

== Categories of synchrotron light sources ==
Synchrotron light sources can be classified into three general categories, also known as "generations".

- First generation light sources: synchrotrons originally built for high-energy particle physics. The existing machines are then modified to produce synchrotron radiation. Some examples of first generation synchrotron light sources include:
  - The Synchrotron Ultraviolet Radiation Facility (SURF), located in Gaithersburg, Maryland
  - The 6 GeV Deutsches Elektronen-Synchrotron (DESY), located in Hamburg, Germany
  - The Laboratori Nazionali di Frascati (LNF)1.1 GeV Electron Synchrotron, located in Rome, Italy
- Second generation light sources: research facilities built specifically for synchrotron radiation production, but are not designed for low emittance. Some examples of second generation light sources include:
  - The Daresbury Synchrotron Radiation Source (SRS), located in Cheshire, England
  - The Hamburg Synchrotron Radiation Laboratory (HASYLAB), located in Hamburg, Germany
- Third generation light sources: research facilities that are built specifically for synchrotron radiation production and are designed for low emittance. Some examples of third generation light sources include:
  - The European Synchrotron Radiation Facility (ESRF), located in Grenoble, France
  - The Source Optimisée de Lumière d'Énergie Intermédiaire (SOLEIL), located in Saint-Aubin, France
  - The Advanced Light Source (ALS), located in Berkeley, California
  - The Berliner Elektronenspeicherring-Gesellschaft für Synchrotronstrahlung (BESSY II), located in Berlin, Germany
  - The Diamond Light Source, located in Oxfordshire, England

== Synchrotron radiation from accelerators ==
Synchrotron radiation may occur in accelerators either as a nuisance, causing undesired energy loss in particle physics contexts, or as a deliberately produced radiation source for numerous laboratory applications. Electrons are accelerated to high speeds in several stages to achieve a final energy that is typically in the gigaelectronvolt range. The electrons are forced to travel in a closed path by strong magnetic fields. This is similar to a radio antenna, but with the difference that the relativistic speed changes the observed frequency due to the Doppler effect by a factor $\gamma$. Relativistic Lorentz contraction bumps the frequency by another factor of $\gamma$, thus multiplying the gigahertz frequency of the resonant cavity that accelerates the electrons into the X-ray range. Another dramatic effect of relativity is that the radiation pattern is distorted from the isotropic dipole pattern expected from non-relativistic theory into an extremely forward-pointing cone of radiation. This makes synchrotron radiation sources the most brilliant known sources of X-rays. The planar acceleration geometry makes the radiation linearly polarized when observed in the orbital plane, and circularly polarized when observed at a small angle to that plane.

The advantages of using synchrotron radiation for spectroscopy and diffraction have been realized by an ever-growing scientific community, beginning in the 1960s and 1970s. In the beginning, accelerators were built for particle physics, and synchrotron radiation was used in "parasitic mode" when bending magnet radiation had to be extracted by drilling extra holes in the beam pipes. The first storage ring commissioned as a synchrotron light source was Tantalus, at the Synchrotron Radiation Center, first operational in 1968.

Bending electromagnets in accelerators were first used to generate this radiation, but to generate stronger "brighter" radiation, other specialized devices – insertion devices – are sometimes employed. Innovations such as the Chasman–Green lattice, an array of magnets which maximises brightness, led to a second-generation of dedicated light sources. The National Synchrotron Light Source at Brookhaven National Laboratory was the first to use such a lattice.

Third-generation synchrotron radiation sources are typically reliant upon these insertion devices, where straight sections of the storage ring incorporate periodic magnetic structures (comprising many magnets in a pattern of alternating N and S poles – see diagram above) which force the electrons into a sinusoidal or helical path. Thus, instead of a single bend, many tens or hundreds of "wiggles" at precisely calculated positions add up or multiply the total intensity of the beam. These devices are called wigglers or undulators. The main difference between an undulator and a wiggler is the intensity of their magnetic field and the amplitude of the deviation from the straight line path of the electrons. The first third-generation light source, built with undulators as part of the initial design, the European Synchrotron Radiation Facility was opened to users in 1994.

Fourth-generation sources, such as the Sirius at the Brazilian Synchrotron Light Laboratory (LNLS), make use of "multi-bend achromat" magnets to further increase brightness of their electron beams.

== Applications of synchrotron radiation ==
- Synchrotron radiation of an electron beam circulating at high energy in a magnetic field leads to radiative self-polarization of electrons in the beam (Sokolov–Ternov effect). This effect is used for producing highly polarised electron beams for use in various experiments.
- Synchrotron radiation sets the beam sizes (determined by the beam emittance) in electron storage rings via the effects of radiation damping and quantum excitation.

== Beamlines ==
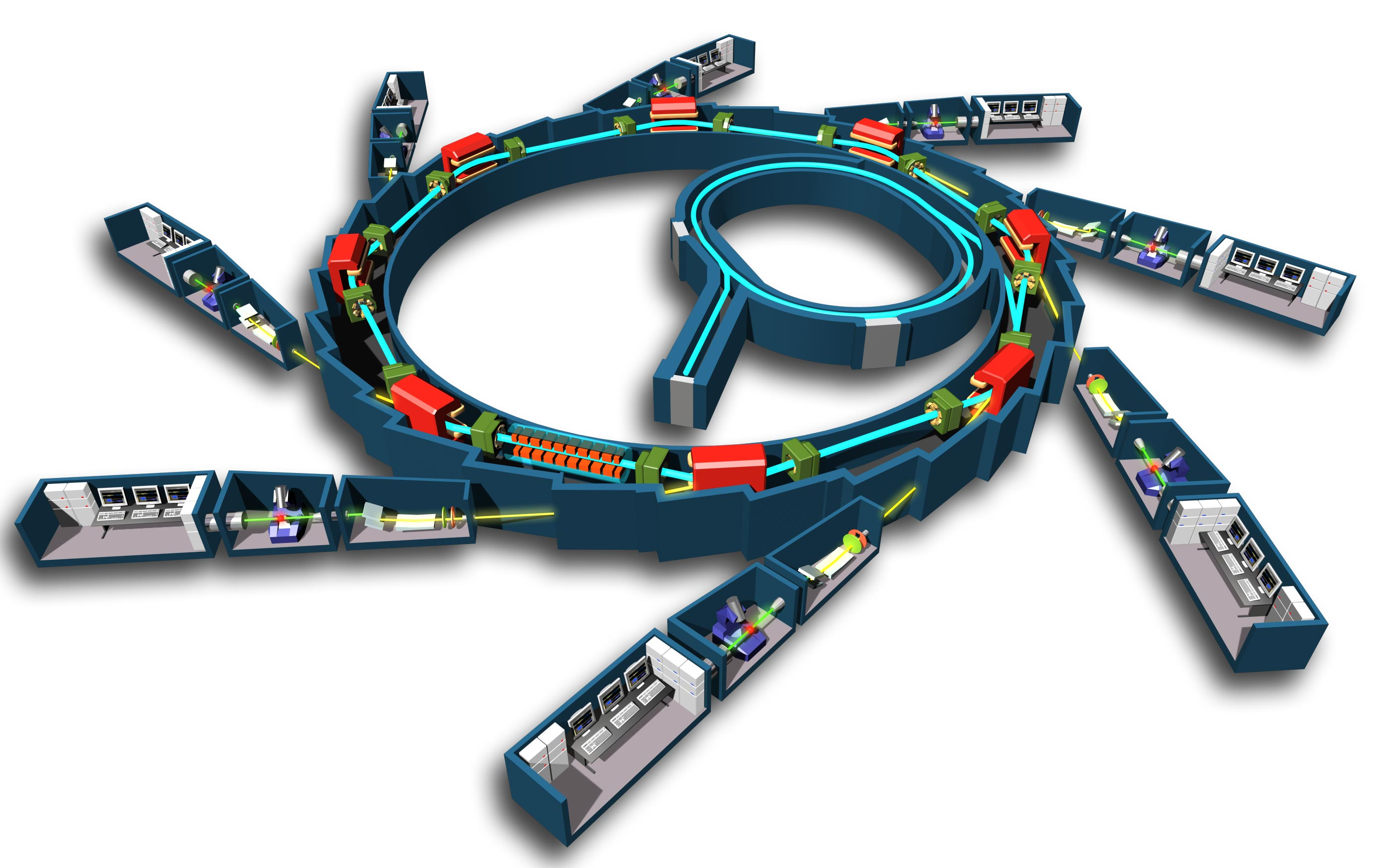
Beamlines of SOLEIL

At a synchrotron facility, electrons are usually accelerated by a synchrotron, and then injected into a storage ring, in which they circulate, producing synchrotron radiation, but without gaining further energy. The radiation is projected at a tangent to the electron storage ring and captured by beamlines. These beamlines may originate at bending magnets, which mark the corners of the storage ring; or insertion devices, which are located in the straight sections of the storage ring. The spectrum and energy of X-rays differ between the two types. The beamline includes X-ray optical devices which control the bandwidth, photon flux, beam dimensions, focus, and collimation of the rays. The optical devices include slits, attenuators, crystal monochromators, and mirrors. The mirrors may be bent into curves or toroidal shapes to focus the beam. A high photon flux in a small area is the most common requirement of a beamline. The design of the beamline will vary with the application. At the end of the beamline is the experimental end station, where samples are placed in the line of the radiation, and detectors are positioned to measure the resulting diffraction, scattering or secondary radiation.

== Experimental techniques and usage ==
Synchrotron light is an ideal tool for many types of research in materials science, physics, and chemistry and is used by researchers from academic, industrial, and government laboratories. Several methods take advantage of the high intensity, tunable wavelength, collimation, and polarization of synchrotron radiation at beamlines which are designed for specific kinds of experiments. The high intensity and penetrating power of synchrotron X-rays enables experiments to be performed inside sample cells designed for specific environments. Samples may be heated, cooled, or exposed to gas, liquid, or high pressure environments. Experiments which use these environments are called in situ and allow the characterization of atomic- to nano-scale phenomena which are inaccessible to most other characterization tools. In operando measurements are designed to mimic the real working conditions of a material as closely as possible.

=== Diffraction and scattering ===
X-ray diffraction (XRD) and scattering experiments are performed at synchrotrons for the structural analysis of crystalline and amorphous materials. These measurements may be performed on powders, single crystals, or thin films. The high resolution and intensity of the synchrotron beam enables the measurement of scattering from dilute phases or the analysis of residual stress. Materials can be studied at high pressure using diamond anvil cells to simulate extreme geologic environments or to create exotic forms of matter.

Structure of a ribosome subunit solved at high resolution using synchrotron X-ray crystallography.

X-ray crystallography of proteins and other macromolecules (PX or MX) are routinely performed. Synchrotron-based crystallography experiments were integral to solving the structure of the ribosome; this work earned the Nobel Prize in Chemistry in 2009.

The size and shape of nanoparticles are characterized using small angle X-ray scattering (SAXS). Nano-sized features on surfaces are measured with a similar technique, grazing-incidence small angle X-ray scattering (GISAXS). In this and other methods, surface sensitivity is achieved by placing the crystal surface at a small angle relative to the incident beam, which achieves total external reflection and minimizes the X-ray penetration into the material.

The atomic- to nano-scale details of surfaces, interfaces, and thin films can be characterized using techniques such as X-ray reflectivity (XRR) and crystal truncation rod (CTR) analysis. X-ray standing wave (XSW) measurements can also be used to measure the position of atoms at or near surfaces; these measurements require high-resolution optics capable of resolving dynamical diffraction phenomena.

Amorphous materials, including liquids and melts, as well as crystalline materials with local disorder, can be examined using X-ray pair distribution function analysis, which requires high energy X-ray scattering data.

By tuning the beam energy through the absorption edge of a particular element of interest, the scattering from atoms of that element will be modified. These so-called resonant anomalous X-ray scattering methods can help to resolve scattering contributions from specific elements in the sample.

Other scattering techniques include energy dispersive X-ray diffraction, resonant inelastic X-ray scattering, and magnetic scattering.

=== Spectroscopy ===
X-ray absorption spectroscopy (XAS) is used to study the coordination structure of atoms in materials and molecules. The synchrotron beam energy is tuned through the absorption edge of an element of interest, and modulations in the absorption are measured. Photoelectron transitions cause modulations near the absorption edge, and analysis of these modulations (called the X-ray absorption near-edge structure (XANES) or near-edge X-ray absorption fine structure (NEXAFS)) reveals information about the chemical state and local symmetry of that element. At incident beam energies which are much higher than the absorption edge, photoelectron scattering causes "ringing" modulations called the extended X-ray absorption fine structure (EXAFS). Fourier transformation of the EXAFS regime yields the bond lengths and number of the surrounding the absorbing atom; it is therefore useful for studying liquids and amorphous materials as well as sparse species such as impurities. A related technique, X-ray magnetic circular dichroism (XMCD), uses circularly polarized X-rays to measure the magnetic properties of an element.

X-ray photoelectron spectroscopy (XPS) can be performed at beamlines equipped with a photoelectron analyzer. Traditional XPS is typically limited to probing the top few nanometers of a material under vacuum. However, the high intensity of synchrotron light enables XPS measurements of surfaces at near-ambient pressures of gas. Ambient pressure XPS (AP-XPS) can be used to measure chemical phenomena under simulated catalytic or liquid conditions. Using high-energy photons yields high kinetic energy photoelectrons which have a much longer inelastic mean free path than those generated on a laboratory XPS instrument. The probing depth of synchrotron XPS can therefore be lengthened to several nanometers, allowing the study of buried interfaces. This method is referred to as high-energy X-ray photoemission spectroscopy (HAXPES). Furthermore, the tunable nature of the synchrotron X-ray photon energies presents a wide range of depth sensitivity in the order of 2-50 nm. This allows for probing of samples at greater depths and for non destructive depth-profiling experiments.

Material composition can be quantitatively analyzed using X-ray fluorescence (XRF). XRF detection is also used in several other techniques, such as XAS and XSW, in which it is necessary to measure the change in absorption of a particular element.

Other spectroscopy techniques include angle resolved photoemission spectroscopy (ARPES), soft X-ray emission spectroscopy, and nuclear resonance vibrational spectroscopy, which is related to Mössbauer spectroscopy.

=== Imaging ===
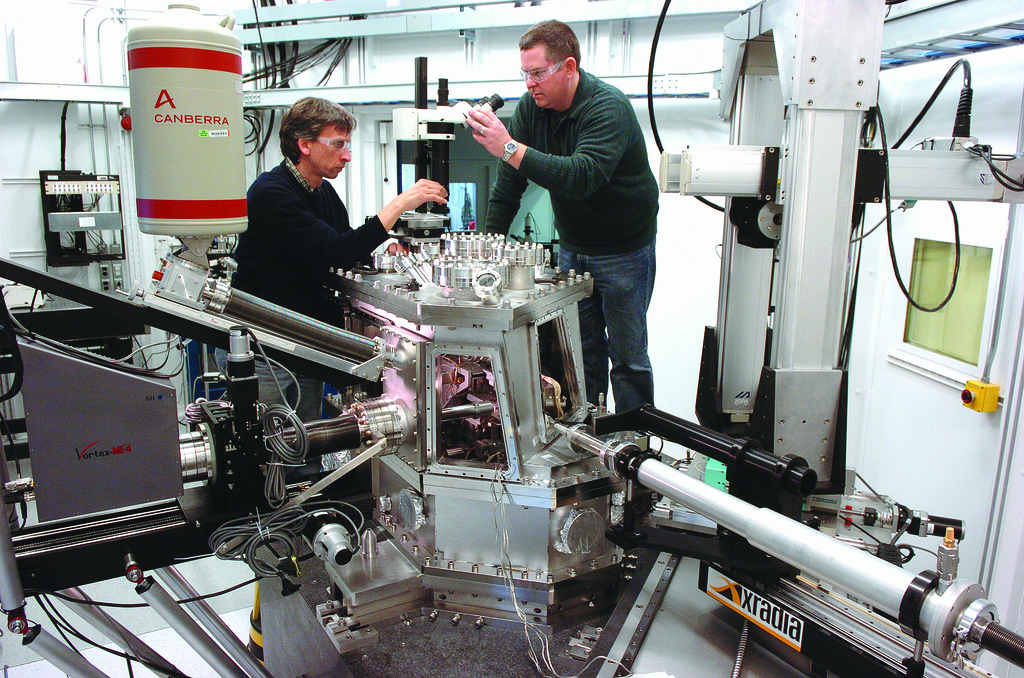
X-ray nanoprobe beamline at the Advanced Photon Source

Synchrotron X-rays can be used for traditional X-ray imaging, phase-contrast X-ray imaging, and tomography. The Ångström-scale wavelength of X-rays enables imaging well below the diffraction limit of visible light, but practically the smallest resolution so far achieved is about 30 nm. Such nanoprobe sources are used for scanning transmission X-ray microscopy (STXM). Imaging can be combined with spectroscopy such as X-ray fluorescence or X-ray absorption spectroscopy in order to map a sample's chemical composition or oxidation state with sub-micron resolution.

X-rays from a synchrotron light source have been used to reveal text hidden under layers of other text in a palimpsest.

== Compact synchrotron light sources ==
Because of the usefulness of tuneable collimated coherent X-ray radiation, efforts have been made to make smaller more economical sources of the light produced by synchrotrons. The aim is to make such sources available within a research laboratory for cost and convenience reasons; at present, researchers have to travel to a facility to perform experiments. One method of making a compact light source is to use the energy shift from Compton scattering near-visible laser photons from electrons stored at relatively low energies of tens of megaelectronvolts (see for example the Compact Light Source (CLS)).

== See also ==
- List of synchrotron radiation facilities
- List of light sources
