= Refrigerator magnet =

Small magnet used to post items on a refrigerator door

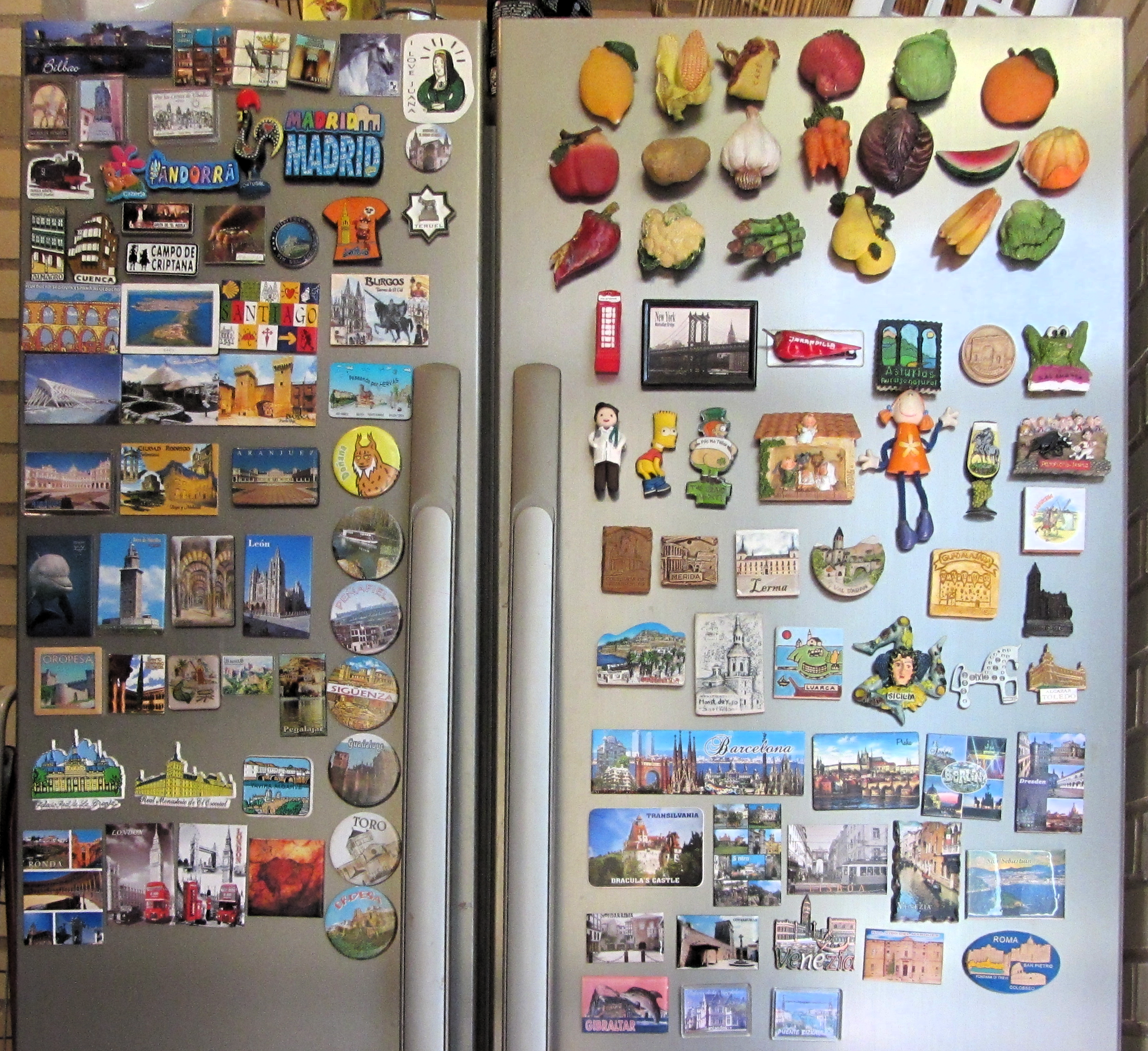
A collection of refrigerator magnets

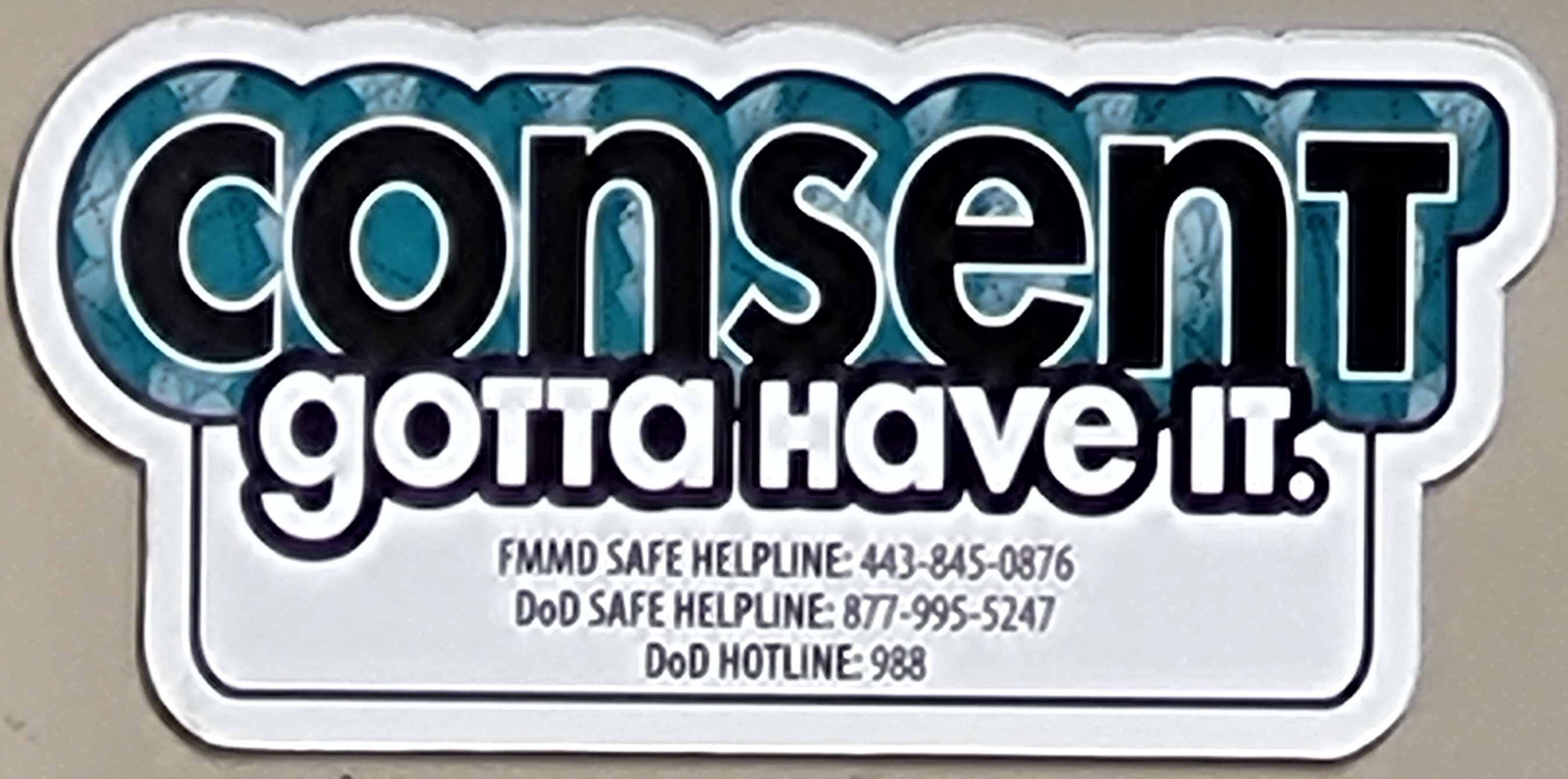
A refrigerator magnet displaying a sexual assault hotline's telephone number

A refrigerator magnet or fridge magnet is a small magnet, often attached to an artistic or whimsical ornament, which may be used to post items such as shopping lists, Christmas cards, child art or reminders on a refrigerator door, or which simply serves as decoration. Refrigerator magnets come in a wide variety of shapes and sizes, and may have promotional messages placed on them. In addition to refrigerators, refrigerator magnets are commonly placed on steel-backed whiteboards and bulletin boards, as well as other metal furniture such as filing cabinets and tool chests. Refrigerator magnets are popular souvenir and collectible objects.

== Manufacture ==
The first refrigerator magnets were inflexible magnets in a cylindrical or rectangular prism shape. Ferrite magnets are commonly used, with decorative elements attached to the magnets with adhesive. They were created in the 1920s.

=== Flexible flat refrigerator magnet ===
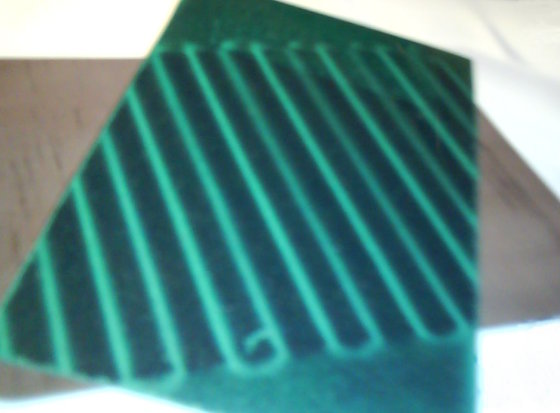
Magnetic viewing film showing magnetic poles of a refrigerator magnet

Later, a flexible magnet was developed, composed of a high-coercivity ferrimagnetic or ferromagnetic compound (usually barium ferrite) mixed with a plastic binder, extruded as a sheet.

==== Halbach array polarization ====
Halbach array polarisation

Unlike most conventional magnets that have distinct north and south poles, most flexible refrigerator magnets are magnetized during manufacture in a sophisticated magnetization pattern called a Halbach array. This construction almost doubles the magnetic field on the refrigerator side and almost zero magnetic field on the other.

This pattern can be impressed on the sheet by rolling a line of powerful cylindrical permanent magnets arranged with alternating magnetic poles. This pattern can be felt by taking two similar (or identical) refrigerator magnets and sliding them against each other with the refrigerator sides facing each other: the magnets will alternately repel and attract as they are moved a few millimeters. The pole-pole distance is on the order of 5 mm, but varies with manufacturer.

== Applications ==
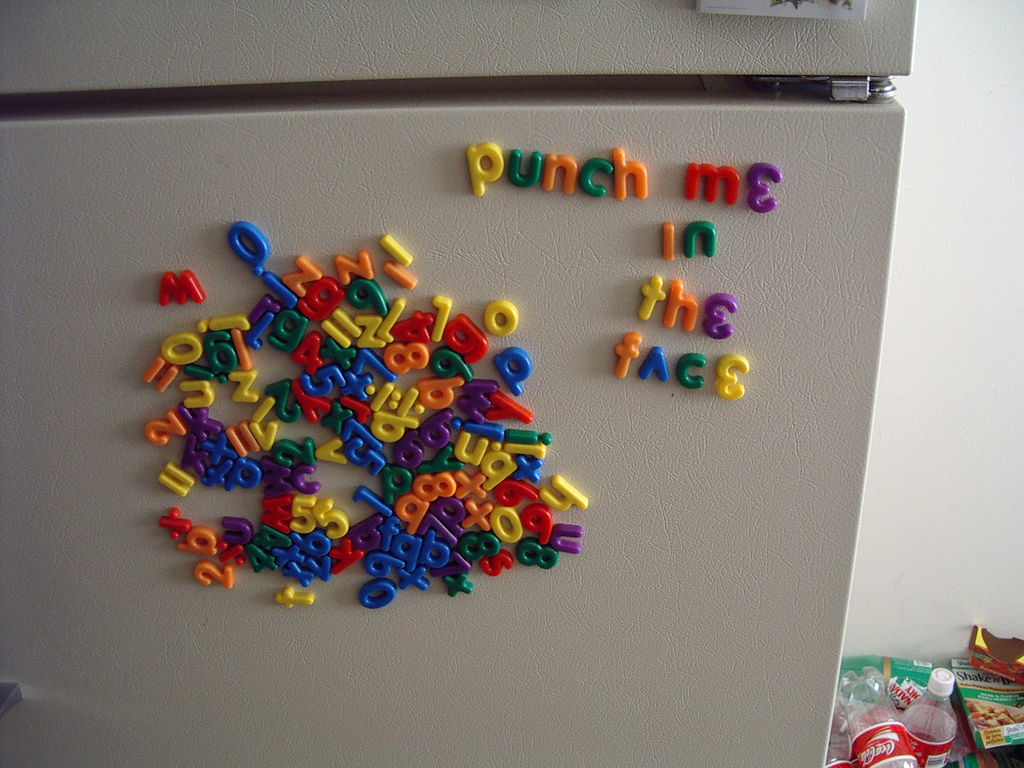
Alphabetical refrigerator magnets

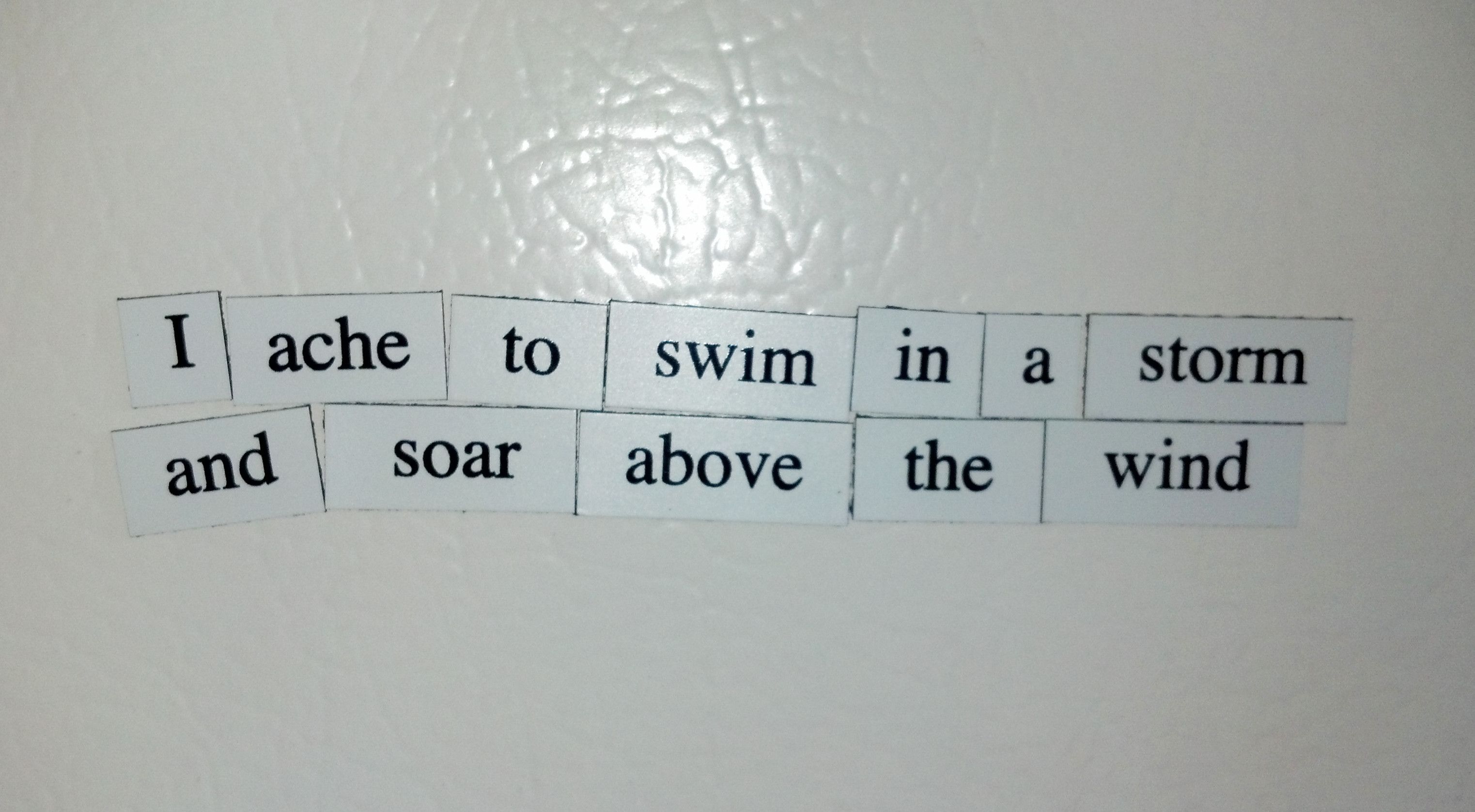
Magnetic poetry

Refrigerator magnets may be designed to decorate refrigerators. Refrigerator magnets are also widely given away as promotional products. Refrigerator magnets can be made from rubber, PVC, polyresin, metal, porcelain, epoxy, or a mixture of some of these materials. A business can put their logo on the magnets for marketing purposes. In addition to their promotional value, refrigerator magnets are popular because they combine functionality with decoration, allowing people to display notes, photos, or shopping lists while adding color and personality to the kitchen.

Refrigerator magnets can also be souvenirs. Many souvenir shops throughout the world sell magnets with local charms printed.

== Collecting ==
Collecting magnets is a hobby, with some collectors specializing in magnets from their travels, or of a particular theme. They are sold at souvenir shops worldwide. There is no generally recognized term (e.g. numismatics for currency collecting) for magnet collecting. A Russian collector has proposed the term memomagnetics (Russian: мемомагнетика), derived from the words memoriale (Latin) and magnetis (Greek) A collector of magnets would be called memomagnetist. These terms have been used by at least one Russian online community for magnet collectors.

According to Collector's Lot magazine, in March 1999, Tony Lloyd of Cardiff, Wales, coined the term "thuramgist" for a "collector of fridge magnets".. Another word is Ferrovenirist, a portmanteau of the Latin for magnet and souvenir.

=== Large collections ===
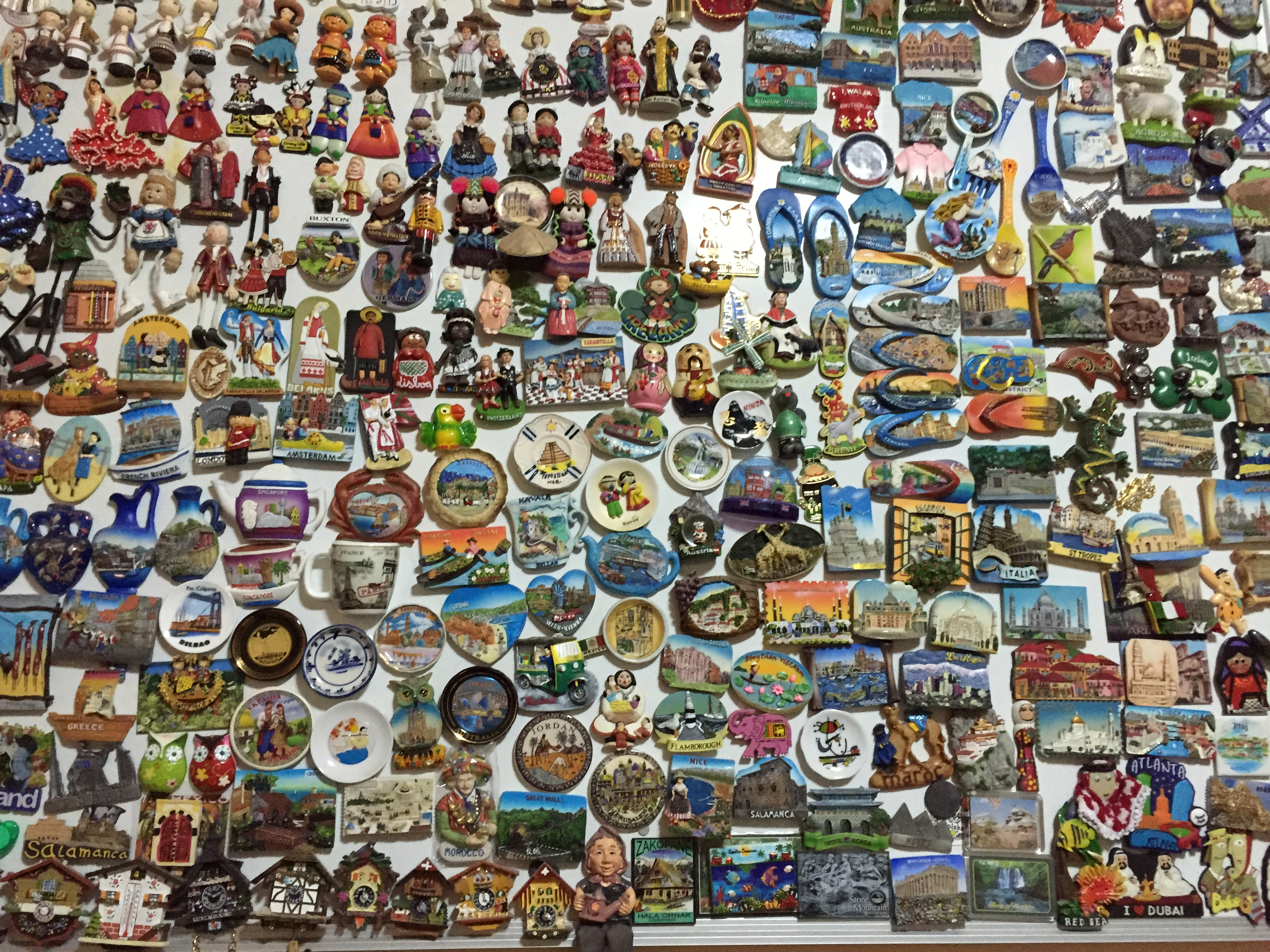
Refrigerator Magnets on a board - Private Collection

At one time, the largest verified collection of refrigerator magnets belonged to Louise J. Greenfarb from Henderson, Nevada (suburb of Las Vegas, United States). Her world record was included to the Guinness World Records with 19,300 items as of 1997. According to the British "Book of alternative records", it grew to 29,000 as of February 2002, and later up to over 30,000 items. Over 7,000 magnets from Greenfarb's collection were exhibited at the Guinness Museum in Las Vegas, which has since closed. According to her son, Bryan Greenfarb, Louise had around 45,000 plus non-duplicate refrigerator magnets by November 2015 but the Guinness verification process, which can take over 6 plus months, is just too taxing to keep validating the exact number. Louise Greenfarb died December 7, 2019. Her son Bryan is in possession of her over 65,000 non-duplicate refrigerator magnets.

In January 1999, Tony Lloyd, a teacher in Cardiff, Wales, was interviewed by the Channel 4 Television programme Collector's Lot when it was ascertained that he had the largest collection of refrigerator magnets in Europe at that time, over 2000. As of January 2016 he had a collection of over 4500. He was again interviewed by the BBC and ITV during 2017. In February 2018, whilst on holiday in Sri Lanka, his 104th country, Tony's collection surpassed 5,000 magnets.
