= Gustav von Bohlen und Halbach =

German diplomat (1831–1890)

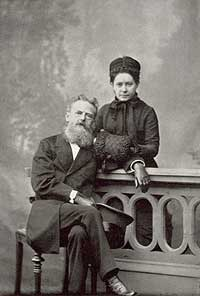

Delegate and Minister at the Prussian Delegation The Hague
- In office 1866–1878

Legation Secretary of the Prussian Delegation in Paris
- In office 1861–1862

Personal details
- Born: Gustav Georg Friedrich Bohlen-Halbach; April 27, 1831 Philadelphia, Pennsylvania, U.S.
- Died: November 9, 1890 (aged 59) Karlsruhe, Grand Duchy of Baden, German Empire
- Spouse: Sophie Bohlen (m. 1862; died 1915)
- Children: 9, including Gustav
- Education: Heidelberg University,
- Occupation: Diplomat

Gustav Georg Friedrich Bohlen-Halbach since 1871 von Bohlen-Halbach (April 27, 1831 – November 9, 1890) was an American-born German diplomat, court master of ceremonies and minister resident for the Grand Duchy of Baden. His fifth son, Gustav Krupp von Bohlen und Halbach, married Bertha Krupp who served as president of the supervisory board of Krupp from 1908 to 1943.

== Early life and education ==
Bohlen-Halbach was born April 27, 1831, in Philadelphia, Pennsylvania to Arnold Halbach, then Prussian consul in Philadelphia (1828–38) and his wife Johanna Karoline Mathilde (née Bohlen; 1800–1882). Despite being born on American soil, it is believed that Bohlen-Halbach, was not an American citizen, since his father was a diplomat. He studied Jurisprudence at Heidelberg University where in 1851 he became a member of Corps Guestphalia Heidelberg, a student association. He completed his degree in 1853.

== Career ==
In 1858 he applied to the Grand Duchy of Baden for a position in diplomacy without salary. He initially served at the legation of the Grand Duchy of Baden at the Prussian court in Berlin. In 1861 he was transferred to Paris as secretary of the legation and given a salary. In 1862 he was transferred to the Delegation in The Hague. Bohlen-Halbach was promoted to envoy extraordinary and minister plenipotentiary in The Hague in 1866 and ennobled on August 14, 1871, adding von to his name. After the embassy was dissolved, he moved to Karlsruhe in 1878. There he became court ceremonial master in 1881.

== Personal life ==
On December 29, 1862, Bohlen-Halbach, married Sophie (née Bohlen; 1837–1915), at Velsen, Netherlands. She was a daughter of Henry Bohlen, who served as a general in the Union Army and died only months before the wedding in the American Civil War. Her father was a half-brother of Gustav's mother which ultimately made them half-first cousins. They had nine children together;

- Arno Heinrich Halbach (1863–1896)
- Alwyn Gustav von Bohlen und Halbach (1865–1938)
- Harry Carlo von Bohlen und Halbach (1866–1919)
- Fritz Petil Borin von Bohlen und Halbach (1868–1941)
- Gustav Krupp von Bohlen und Halbach (1870–1950) whom married Bertha Krupp
- Carolina Emily Sophie Ernestine von Bohlen und Halbach (born 1872)
- Emily von Bohlen und Halbach (1874–1939)
- Wilhelm Friedrich Hans von Bohlen und Halbach (born 1878)
- Kurt von Bohlen und Halbach

On October 14, 1871, Bohlen-Halbach, was ennobled and therefore added the von to his name, this also applied to his descendants. In 1878, he moved from The Hague to Karlsruhe, where in October 1885 he purchased Obergrombach Castle near Bruchsal. He died aged 59 in Karlsruhe in 1890 and was buried at Obergrombach.

== Legacy ==
In Obergrombach (Bruchsal) there are two streets named for the couple; Gustav-von-Bohlen-Straße and Sofienstraße.
