= Magnetic field viewing film =

Film used to visualize invisible magnetic fields of an object

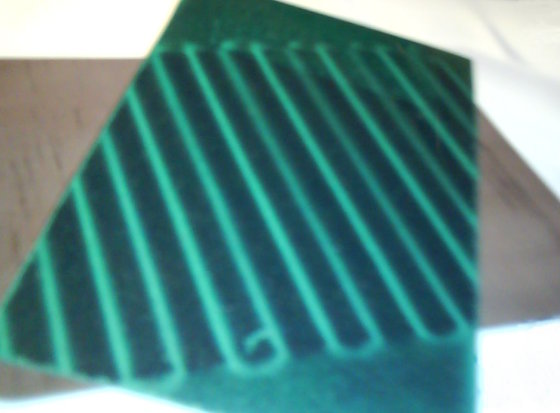
Magnetic viewing film showing magnetic poles of a refrigerator magnet. The poles are dark, and pole edges are bright.

Magnetic field viewing film is used to show stationary or (less often) slowly changing magnetic fields; it shows their location and direction. It is a translucent thin flexible sheet, coated with micro-capsules containing nickel flakes suspended in oil. When magnetic lines of force are parallel to the surface of the carrier sheet, the surfaces of the flakes are reflective, and appear bright. When lines of force are perpendicular to the sheet, the flakes are edge-on, and appear significantly darker. When the film is placed on a magnet's pole, the latter case applies.

Magnetic field viewing film together with a ruler can be used to measure the poles per inch of a magnet.

== See also ==
- Ferrofluid
- Magna Doodle
