= Gustav Krupp von Bohlen und Halbach =

German foreign service official, businessman and accused war criminal (1870–1950)

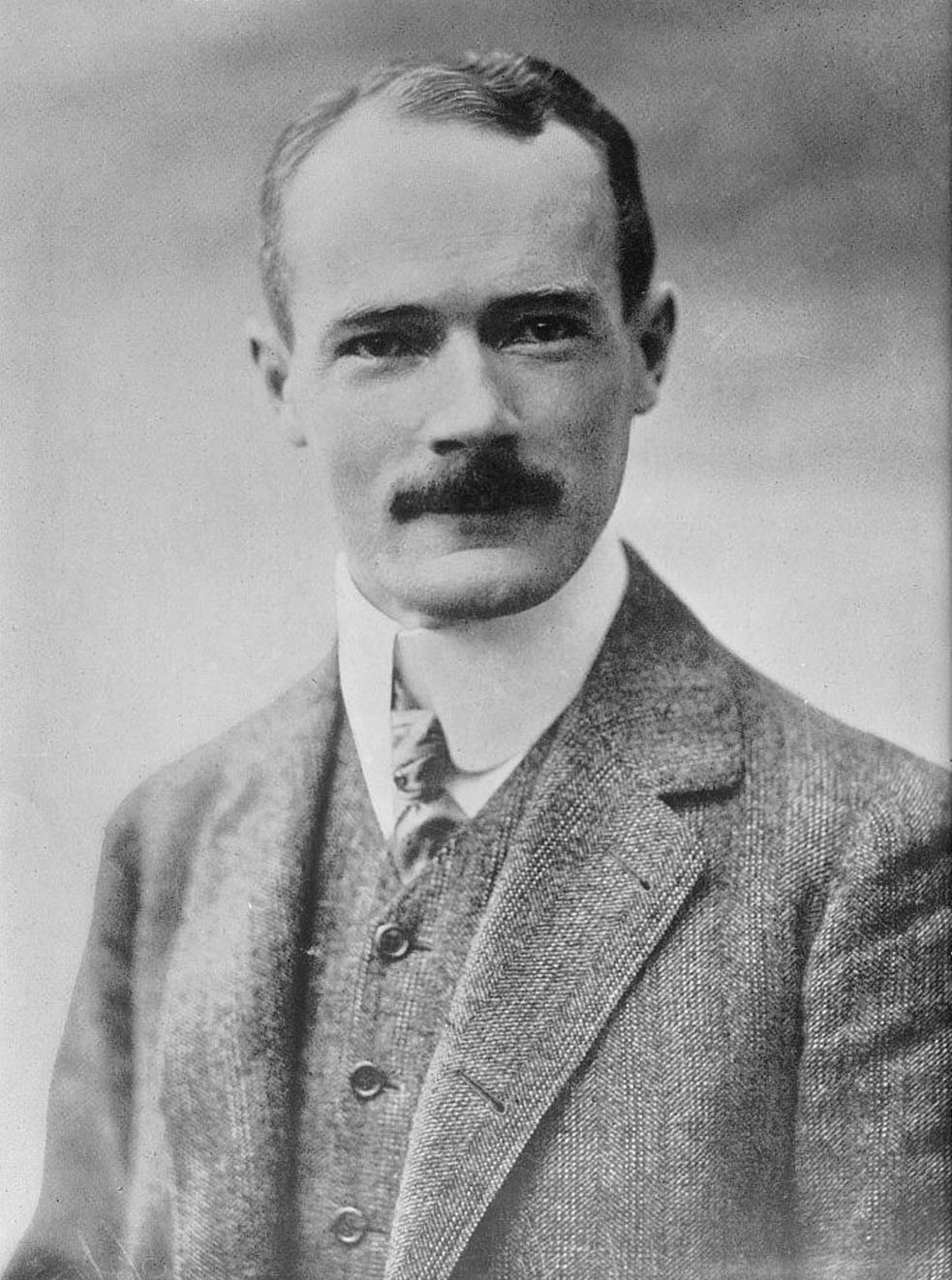
- Gustav Krupp in 1915
- Born: 7 August 1870; The Hague, Netherlands
- Died: 16 January 1950 (aged 79); Werfen, Salzburg, Allied-occupied Austria
- Education: University of Heidelberg
- Occupations: Chairman of the board of Friedrich Krupp AG, 1909–1945
- Spouse: Bertha Krupp
- Children: 8, including Alfried Krupp
- Father: Gustav von Bohlen und Halbach

Gustav Georg Friedrich Maria Krupp von Bohlen und Halbach (born Gustav von Bohlen und Halbach; 7 August 1870 – 16 January 1950) was a German diplomat and industrialist. From 1909 to 1945, he headed Friedrich Krupp AG, a heavy industry conglomerate, and led the company through two world wars along with his son Alfried, providing significant weapons and materials for the German war effort.

Born in The Hague into a German family with a long history in diplomatic service, Gustav von Bohlen und Halbach was the Prussian consul at the Vatican when he married Bertha Krupp, the heiress of the Krupp family, at the behest of Emperor Wilhelm II. He was allowed to add the Krupp name to his own and subsequently became chairman of the company. Under Krupp, the company had a near monopoly in heavy arms manufacture in Germany at the outbreak of the First World War, and was responsible for the production of Big Bertha, the Paris Gun and the U-boat.

Krupp took part in the German rearmament in secret shortly after the signature of the Treaty of Versailles. An avowed monarchist, he was initially opposed to the Nazis, but eventually became a fervent supporter of Adolf Hitler and offered significant financial support for the Nazi Party. From the late 1930s on he was gradually reduced to a figurehead of the company due to deteriorating health, and in 1943 he was formally succeeded by his son. At the end of World War II, plans to prosecute him as a war criminal at the Nuremberg trials were dropped as he was bedridden, senile and deemed medically unfit to stand trial. Krupp died in Austria in 1950.

== Early life ==
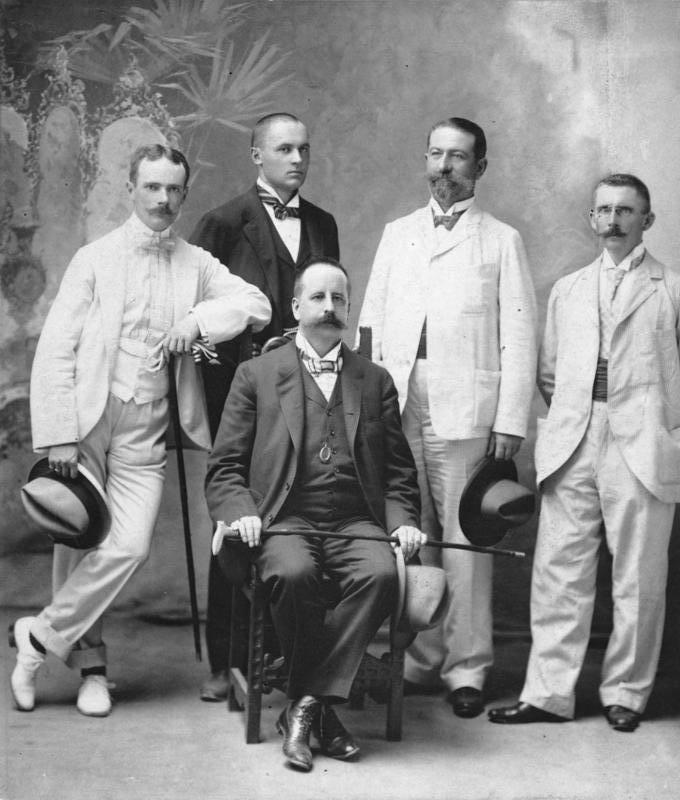
The young Gustav von Bohlen und Halbach ca. 1900 (left)

Gustav Krupp von Bohlen und Halbach was born 7 August 1870 in The Hague, Netherlands, to American-born Gustav von Bohlen und Halbach, and Sophie (née Bohlen). His paternal grandfather, Arnold Halbach, served as Prussian consul in Philadelphia from 1828 to 1838.

He was a grandson of Henry Bohlen and related to Charles E. Bohlen and Karoline of Wartensleben on his mother's side.

He married Bertha Krupp in October 1906. Bertha had inherited her family's company in 1902 at age 16 after the death of her father, Friedrich Alfred Krupp. German Emperor Kaiser William II personally led a search for a suitable spouse for Bertha, as the Krupp empire could not be headed by a woman. Gustav was picked from his previous post at the Vatican. The Kaiser announced at the wedding that Gustav would be allowed to add the Krupp name to his own. Gustav became company chairman in 1909.

After 1910, the Krupp company became a member and major funder of the Pan-German League (Alldeutscher Verband) which mobilised popular support in favour of two army bills, in 1912 and 1913, to raise Germany's standing army to 738,000 men.

== World War I ==
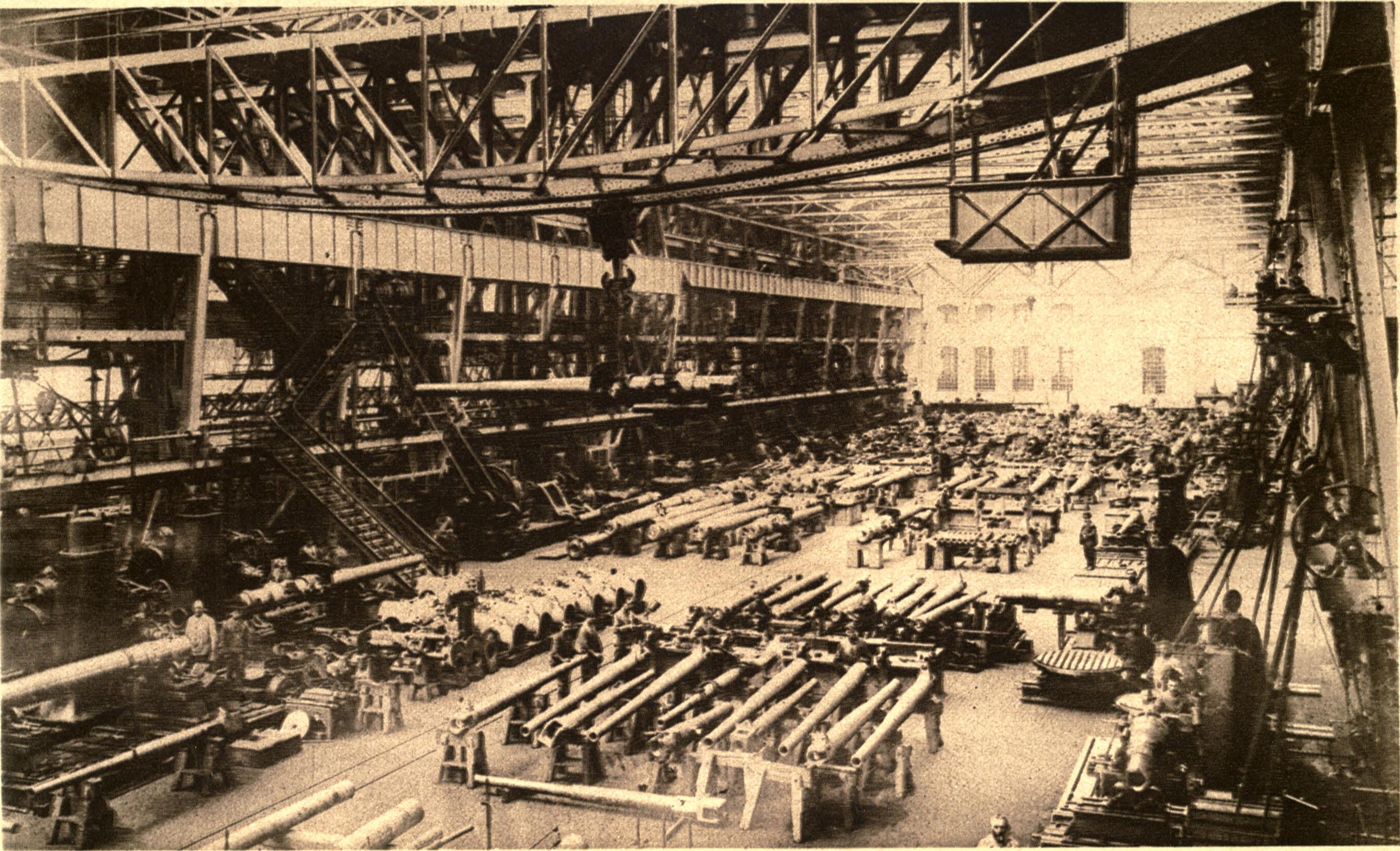
The Krupp Armament-Works, 1915

By World War I, the company had a near monopoly in heavy arms manufacture in Germany. At the start of the war, the company lost access to most of its overseas markets, but this was more than offset by increased demand for weapons by Germany and her allies (Central Powers). In 1902, before Krupp's marriage, the company leased a fuse patent to Vickers Limited of the United Kingdom. Among the company's products was a 94-ton howitzer named Big Bertha, after Krupp's wife, and the Paris Gun. Gustav also won the lucrative contract for Germany's U-boats, which were built at the family's shipyard in Kiel. Krupp's estate, the Villa Hügel, had a suite of rooms for Wilhelm II whenever he came to visit.

== Interwar years ==
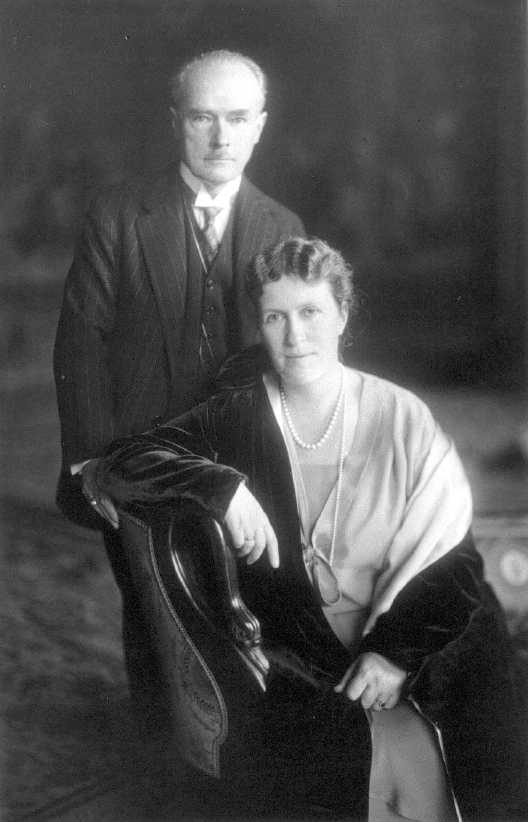
Gustav and Bertha Krupp von Bohlen und Halbach, 1927

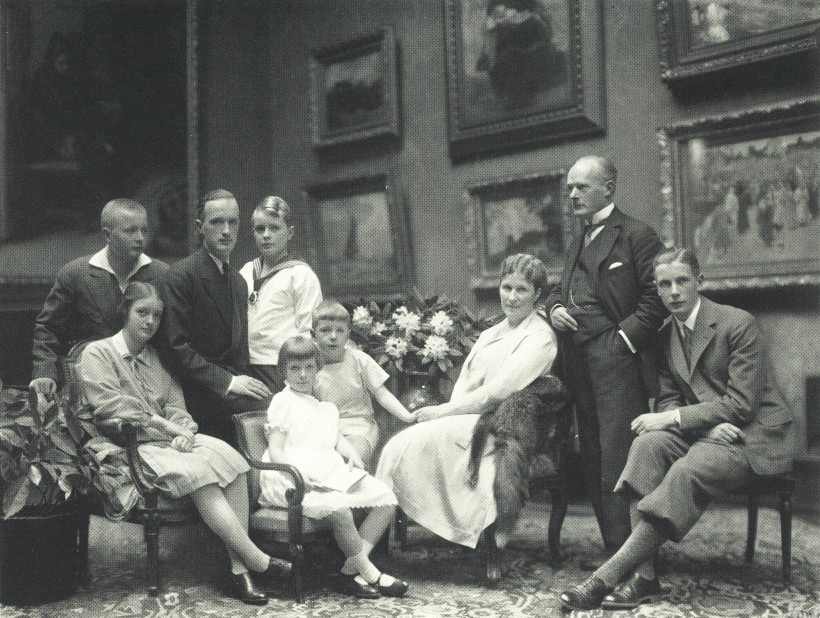
Portrait of Gustav Krupp von Bohlen und Halbach and family, 1928 by Nicola Perscheid. Alfried Krupp von Bohlen und Halbach, third from left.

During the occupation of the Ruhr in 1923, the directorate of the Krupp works ordered its employees to cease work, in line with the German policy of passive resistance to the occupation. A French military court sentenced Gustav Krupp to 15 years forced labour, though he was released on parole after six months once the German government abandoned its passive resistance strategy.

The Versailles Treaty prevented Germany from making armaments and submarines, forcing Krupp to significantly reduce his labour force. His company diversified to agricultural equipment, vehicles and consumer goods. However, using the profits from the Vickers patent deal and subsidies from the Weimar government, Krupp secretly began the rearming of Germany with the ink barely dry on the treaty of Versailles. It secretly continued to work on artillery through subsidiaries in Sweden, and built submarine pens in the Netherlands. In the 1930s, it restarted manufacture of tanks such as the Tiger I and other war materials, again using foreign subsidiaries.

Krupp was a member of the Prussian State Council from 1921 to 1933. While Krupp was an avowed monarchist, his first loyalty was to whoever held power. He once left a business meeting in disgust when another industrialist, who was the one hosting the meeting, referred to the late President Friedrich Ebert as "that saddlemaker" (Der Sattelhersteller).

Krupp initially opposed the Nazis. However, after Hitler became chancellor of Germany, at the secret meeting with Adolf Hitler and leading German industrialists on February 20, 1933, he contributed one million Reichsmark to the Nazi party's fund for the March 1933 election, which enabled Hitler to take control of the government. After Hitler won power, Krupp became, as Fritz Thyssen later put it, "a super Nazi", and contributed to the Adolf Hitler Fund of German Trade and Industry which was established in June 1933 to support the Nazis. As president of the Reichsverband of German industry he led the effort to expel its Jewish members.

Like many German nationalists, Krupp believed that the Nazis could be used to end the Republic, and then be pushed aside to restore the Kaiser and the old elites. When all parties were abolished and civil liberties suspended following the Reichstag fire and Hitler's grab for absolute power, Krupp found that he and the rest of the old elites were firmly in the grip of the Nazis; the movement they had hoped to ride back into power upon had instead emasculated them. Despite this, Krupp was always flexible, and cooperated with Hitler's dictatorship.

I wanted and had to maintain Krupp, in spite of all opposition, as an armament plant for the later future, even if in camouflaged form. I could only speak in the smallest, most intimate circles about the real reasons which made me undertake the changeover of the plants for certain lines of production for I had to expect that many people would not understand me

— Krupp in an interview for Krupp magazine on 1 March 1942

Hitler had tried to gain entry to the Krupp factories in 1929, but was rebuffed because Krupp felt he would see some of the secret armament work there and reveal it to the world. Bertha Krupp never liked Hitler even though she never complained when the company's bottom line rose through the armaments contracts and production. She referred to him as "that certain gentleman" (Dieser gewisse Herr) and pleaded illness when Hitler came on an official tour in 1934. Her daughter Irmgard acted as hostess.

== World War II ==
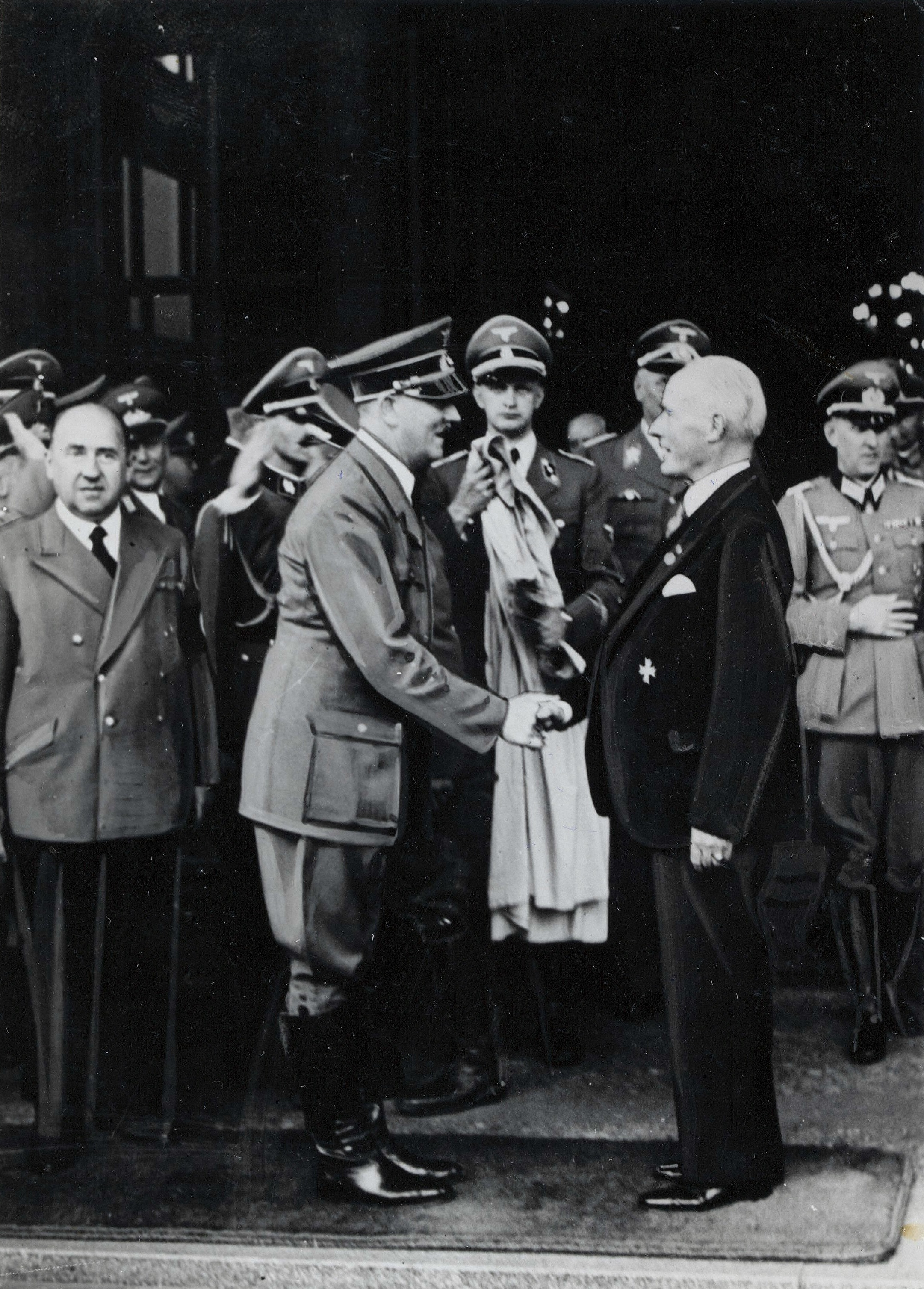
Gustav Krupp receives the Golden Party Badge of the NSDAP from Adolf Hitler in the German city of Essen, 1940

Krupp suffered failing health from 1939 onwards, and a stroke left him partially paralysed in 1941. He became a figurehead until he formally handed over the running of the business to his son Alfried in 1943. Krupp industries, under both his leadership and later that of his son, was offered facilities in eastern Europe and made extensive use of forced labour during the war.

On 25 July 1943 the Royal Air Force attacked the Krupp Works with 627 heavy bombers, dropping 2,032 long tons of bombs in an Oboe-marked attack. Upon his arrival at the works the next morning, Krupp suffered a fit from which he never recovered.

== Nuremberg Trials ==
Following the Allied victory, plans to prosecute Gustav Krupp as a war criminal at the 1945 Nuremberg Trials were dropped because by then he was bedridden and senile. Despite his personal absence from the prisoners' dock, however, Krupp remained technically still under indictment and liable to prosecution in subsequent proceedings.

== Personal life ==
In 1906, then von Bohlen-Halbach, married Bertha Krupp (1886–1957), the daughter and sole heiress of Friedrich Alfred Krupp respectively the Krupp concern, with whom he had eight children;

- Alfried Krupp von Bohlen und Halbach (1907–1967), married firstly to Anneliese Lampert (née Bahr; 1909–1998) with whom he had his only child Arndt von Bohlen und Halbach. He secondly married Vera Knauer (née Hossenfeldt; formerly Langen and Wisbar; 1910–1967), without issue.
- Arnold Gustav Hans von Bohlen und Halbach (1908–1909), died in childbed.
- Claus Arthur Arnold von Bohlen und Halbach (1910–1940), married to Sita von Medinger (1912–1997), had one son.
- Irmgard Sophie Margarethe von Bohlen und Halbach (1912–1998), married firstly Johann "Hanno" Freiherr Raitz von Frentz (1906–1941), secondly to Robert Eilenstein (1920–1986).
- Berthold Ernst August von Bohlen und Halbach (1913–1987), married to Edith von Maltzan Freiin zu Wartenberg und Penzlin (1919–2009).
- Harald Georg Wilhelm von Bohlen und Halbach (1916–1983), married Doerte Hillringhaus (1934–2002).
- Waldtraut Elisabeth Mechthild von Bohlen und Halbach (1920–2005), married firstly Henry Thomas (1912–) and secondly Walter Burckhardt.
- Eckbert Wolfgang Eberhardt von Bohlen und Halbach (1922–1945), unmarried and without issue.

Krupp passed away at his residence near Werfen, Salzburg in Austria on 16 January 1950. By decret, only his oldest son, who became the sole heir to the Krupp concern, could bear the surname Krupp von Bohlen und Halbach.

== See also ==
- Secret Meeting of 20 February 1933
