= Wiggler (synchrotron) =

Insertion device for a synchrotron

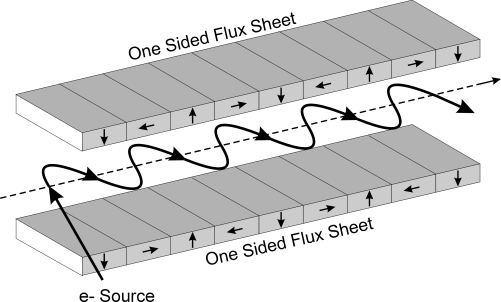
Schematic diagram of a Halbach Array component in a free electron laser showing the orientation of magnets

A wiggler is an insertion device in a synchrotron. It is a series of magnets designed to periodically laterally deflect ('wiggle') a beam of charged particles (invariably electrons or positrons) inside a storage ring of a synchrotron. These deflections create a change in acceleration which in turn produces emission of broad synchrotron radiation tangent to the curve, much like that of a bending magnet, but the intensity is higher due to the contribution of many magnetic dipoles in the wiggler. Furthermore, as the wavelength (λ) is decreased this means the frequency (ƒ) has increased. This increase of frequency is directly proportional to energy, hence, the wiggler creates a wavelength of light with a larger energy.

A wiggler has a broader spectrum of radiation than an undulator.

Typically the magnets in a wiggler are arranged in a Halbach array. The design shown above is usually known as a Halbach wiggler.

== History ==
The first suggestion of a wiggler magnet to produce synchrotron radiation was made by K. W. Robinson in an unpublished report at the Cambridge Electron Accelerator (CEA) at Harvard University in 1956. CEA built the first wiggler in 1966, not as a source of synchrotron radiation, but to provide additional damping of betatron and synchrotron oscillations to create a beam storage system. A wiggler magnet was first used as a synchrotron radiation source at the Stanford Synchrotron Radiation Lightsource (SSRL) in 1979.
