= Undulator =

Insertion device consisting of dipole magnets

Working of the undulator. 1: magnets, 2: electron beam entering from the upper left, 3: synchrotron radiation exiting to the lower right

An undulator is an insertion device from high-energy physics and usually part of a larger installation, a synchrotron storage ring, or it may be a component of a free electron laser. It consists of a periodic structure of dipole magnets. These can be permanent magnets or superconducting magnets. The static magnetic field alternates along the length of the undulator with a wavelength $\lambda_u$. Electrons traversing the periodic magnet structure are forced to undergo oscillations and thus to radiate energy. The radiation produced in an undulator is very intense and concentrated in narrow energy bands in the spectrum. It is also collimated on the orbit plane of the electrons. This radiation is guided through beamlines for experiments in various scientific areas.

The undulator strength parameter is:

$$K=\frac{e B \lambda_u}{2 \pi m_e c}$$,

where e is the electron charge, B is the magnetic field, $\lambda_u$ is the spatial period of the undulator magnets, $m_{e}$ is the electron rest mass, and c is the speed of light.

This parameter characterizes the nature of the electron motion. For $K\ll 1$ the oscillation amplitude of the motion is small and the transverse deflection nearly sinusoidal as a function of time, so that long undulators can have narrow on-axis bandwidth, and most of the radiated power at around the fundamental wavelength. For $1\ll K$ the oscillation amplitude is large and the transverse deflection is no longer sinusoidal in time so that it contains Fourier components of high harmonics of the fundamental wavelength. This kind of device naturally has a much larger bandwidth and is typically called a wiggler.

Away from the axis of the undulator, the radiation spectrum is broadened by the angle dependent Doppler effect, so to observe the naturally narrow bandwidth, one has to use a small aperture to select only the central radiation cone.

For a device with $N$ periods and a small enough aperture, the brightness of an undulator scales like $N^2$ while the brightness of a wiggler only scales like $N$. The difference is due to the naturally narrower bandwidth of the undulator. Since the radiation emitted from an undulator is incoherent, the power scales linearly with the number of electrons. In a Free-electron laser, some coherence is achieved and the power can scale with a higher power of the number of electrons.

The polarization of the emitted radiation can be controlled by using permanent magnets to induce different periodic electron trajectories through the undulator. If the oscillations are confined to a plane the radiation will be linearly polarized. If the oscillation trajectory is helical, the radiation will be circularly polarized, with the handedness determined by the helix.

An undulator's figure of merit is spectral radiance.

== History ==
The Russian physicist Vitaly Ginzburg showed theoretically that undulators could be built in a 1947 paper. Julian Schwinger published a useful paper in 1949 that reduced the necessary calculations to Bessel functions, for which there were tables. This was significant for solving the design equations as digital computers were not available to most academics at that time.

Hans Motz and his coworkers at Stanford University demonstrated the first undulator in 1952. It produced the first manmade coherent infrared radiation. The design could produce a total frequency range from visible light down to millimeter waves.
