= Nuclear power in Jordan =

In December 2016, the Jordan Atomic Energy Commission (JAEC), in cooperation with a consortium headed by the Korean Atomic Energy Research Institute, inaugurated the 5 MW Jordan Research and Training Reactor. The facility is the first nuclear reactor in the country. It will provide radioactive isotopes for medical usage in Jordan, and will provide training for students at the University to produce a skilled workforce for the country's planned commercial nuclear reactors.

As of 2023, Jordan is considering options for purchasing small modular reactors.

== Nuclear power plans ==
In 2007, Jordan's Committee for Nuclear Strategy was formed in order to start the development of nuclear programs in Jordan. Its ultimate goal is for nuclear power to provide 30% of Jordan's electricity by 2030, and to provide electricity for export. From this program, the Jordan Atomic Energy Commission and the Jordan Nuclear Regulatory Commission were developed. Also in 2007, Jordan announced a plan which would help develop a civic nuclear program. This nuclear program would assist in diversifying Jordan's energy portfolio, which would help reduce Jordan's dependence on energy imports, which currently consumes one fifth of GDP. During the era of Saddam Hussein, Jordan was forced to rely on receiving oil at a reduced price from Iraq. The invasion by the United States in 2003 interrupted the deals and forced Jordan to look elsewhere for oil, so Jordan turned to Egypt for oil and gas. The Arab Spring and the 2011 ousting of Egyptian President Hosni Mubarak interrupted this supply of oil, setting Jordan back further in their energy crisis. Jordan has since become dependent on gas imports from Israel, which are highly unpopular in Jordan.

In April 2012 the Jordan Atomic Energy Commission shortened the list from seven to two possible reactor vendors. The two vendors have been narrowed down to Areva-Mitsubishi Heavy Industries and Russia's AtomStroyExport. The reactor technology has yet to be decided upon, however, the tentative deadline for this decision is set in the middle of May 2014. The research reactor will become a focal point for a Nuclear Technology Centre, which will train upcoming generations of nuclear engineers and scientists in the Kingdom in addition to provide irradiation services for the industrial, agricultural and medical sectors. In March 2013, Jordan received approval to begin construction on the Jordan Research and Training Reactor at the Jordan University of Science and Technology. The approximate cost of the reactor is $130 million, with at least $70 million being loaned by the South Korean government.

In 2018, Jordan announced it had abandoned plans to build gigawatt sized reactors within the next 10 years, due to difficulties providing adequate cooling water and financing. Instead Jordan would consider small modular reactor options.

In 2018, the Commission announced that Jordan was in talks with multiple companies to build the country's first commercial nuclear plant, a Helium-cooled reactor that is scheduled for completion by 2025.

Jordan has also granted Areva exclusive mining rights for uranium in central Jordan.

== International relations ==
Jordan has relied on international cooperation to access nuclear technology. In order to become a nuclear nation, Jordan has had to sign numerous agreements and create new relations with countries throughout the world. Jordan has signed memorandums of understanding with the United States, United Kingdom, Canada, France, Japan, China, Russia, Spain, South Korea, Argentina, Romania, and Turkey. In December 2009, Jordan Atomic Energy Commission (JAEC) in cooperation with a consortium headed by the Korean Atomic Energy Research Institute signed an agreement with Daewoo Heavy Industries to build its first research reactor by 2014 at the Jordan University of Science and Technology.

Jordan is a signatory to the Treaty on the Non-Proliferation of Nuclear Weapons, which promotes peaceful uses of nuclear energy. Jordan takes its commitment to this treaty seriously and thus aims to pursue an internationally approved path to obtaining nuclear energy. In October 2013 the Russian VVER-1000 design was selected in a competitive tender for Jordan's first twin reactor nuclear power station. As recently as April, 2014, King Abdullah II met with Russian President Vladimir Putin to discuss a possible Jordanian-Russian nuclear cooperation.

Jordan has signed memorandums of understanding with the United States, United Kingdom, Canada, France, Japan, China, Russia, Spain, South Korea, Argentina, Romania, and Turkey, for assisting Jordan with nuclear power and uranium mining.

== Environmental concerns ==
=== Anti-nuclear campaigns ===
As the Jordanian government moves closer to the development of nuclear power plants, the local anti-nuclear movement has picked up steam. The movement is led by Basel Burgan, an environmentalist and activist who heads the National Campaign, an anti-nuclear energy non-profit. The National Campaign stresses the idea that the nuclear power plants would contaminate Jordan's scarce water supply. Several Greenpeace volunteers in Jordan took part in Jordan's anti-nuclear movement. They encouraged the government to entertain the idea of creating an energy policy based on renewable resources. In 2013, Greenpeace published a report titled "Jordan's Renewable Energy Future" to raise concerns about nuclear energy—especially water and seismic issues—and advocate for increased use of renewable energy sources. Greenpeace Jordan believes that Jordan will be able to meet 100% of its energy needs with renewables by 2050.

Opponents of nuclear energy are particularly concerned about nuclear power plants' impacts on Jordan's water supply. Jordan is the fourth water-poorest country in the world, and has less than 15% of the UN water poverty line. One possible site for a reactor would be above the Azraq Aquifer, which supplies most of Amman's freshwater. Environmentalists caution that a minor accident at the plant could poison up to 1/3 of the water in the country. Jordan is already facing rapid depletion of water resources, questioning if the country can afford to take the risk of building these power plants. Jordan's Federation for Environmental Societies has used Jordan's lack of water resources as a platform for their anti-nuclear view. The lack of water has also raised concerns about the cooling towers, which would use approximately 500 million cubic meters of water annually.

== See also ==
- Jordan Atomic Energy Commission
- Jordan University of Science and Technology
- Jordan Research and Training Reactor
