= Gihan Kamel =

Egyptian physicist

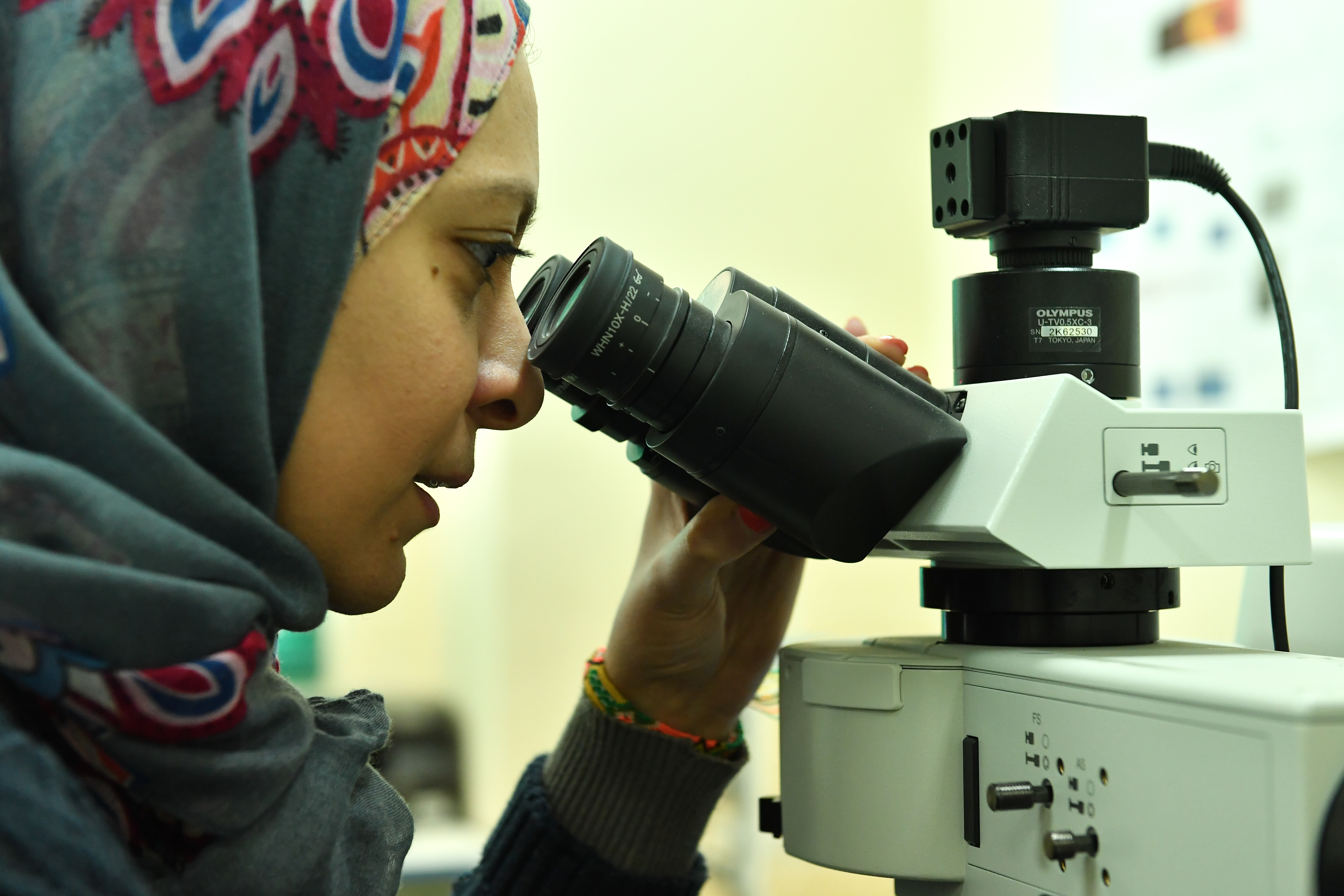
- Born: 1976 (age 49–50)
- Education: Helwan University; Sapienza University of Rome
- Occupation: Physicist
- Known for: Synchrotron-light for Experimental Science and Applications in the Middle East
- Scientific career
- Fields: Physics

Gihan Kamel is an Egyptian physicist known for her work as an Infrared Beamline Scientist in the Synchrotron-light project for Experimental Science and Applications in the Middle East (SESAME). She lives in Jordan.

== Education and early life ==
Gihan's mother is a doctor and her father is a teacher. The "idea that science and engineering were meant only for men became [her] strongest motivation" to pursue a career in science.

She studied physics at Helwan University in Cairo, obtaining a B.A. and an MSc in solid-state physics before moving to Italy, where she obtained a Ph.D in biophysics in 2011 at the Sapienza University of Rome.

== Career and research ==
She is a lecturer in Biophysics at Helwan University, and since the mid-2000s she has been interested in the SESAME project, which brings together nine countries (Bahrain, Cyprus, Egypt, Jordan, Pakistan, Turkey, Palestine, Iran and Israel), and is currently the only woman scientist on the project.

In 2015, she earned recognition for her presentation at a TED conference on the theme of "Breaking the Rules".

In 2023, she was one of the six women chosen by Nature journal to comment on their plans for International Women's Day. The others were Sandra Diaz, Martina Anto-Ocrah, Jess Wade, Aster Gebrekirstos and Tanya Monro.

In 2025, Gihan received the John Wheatley Award with Simon Connell and Sekazi Mtingwa.
