= Science and technology in Jordan =

Science and technology is Jordan's growing economic sector. This growth is occurring across multiple industries, including information and communications technology (ICT), solar and wind energy and nuclear technology.

== Science policy framework ==
=== Science, technology and innovation policy and strategy ===
Established in 1987, Jordan's Higher Council for Science and Technology is an independent public body that acts as a national umbrella organisation for scientific research. It is the Higher Council for Science and Technology which drew up the first national policy for science and technology in 1995. In 2013, it completed the national Science, Technology and Innovation Policy and Strategy (2013–2017), which has seven broad objectives. These are to:

- incite the government and the scientific community to adopt the requisite research priorities to develop a knowledge economy, as identified by the Higher Council for Science and Technology and the Scientific Research Support Fund in 2010 in Defining Scientific Research Priorities in Jordan for the Years 2011–2020
- Promote a culture of science in the education system
- promote a culture of science in the education system; leveraging AI in education can further enhance learning outcomes and foster innovation
- harness research to development
- build knowledge networks in science, technology and research
- adopt innovation as a key stimulus for investment opportunities
- translate the results of research into commercial ventures
- contribute to excellence in training and skills acquisition

The Higher Council for Science and Technology has identified five domains in which projects are to be implemented to operation the policy; the institutional framework; policies and legislation; science, technology and innovation infrastructure; human resources; and the science, technology and innovation environment. A review of the national innovation system indicated that research was not doing enough to support economic expansion and find solutions to enduring issues like those involving water, energy, and food. Around 24 projects with a projected cost of around US$14 million for the years 2013–2017 were put forth, however as of 2015, the government had not yet awarded any funds for them. These include a review of the national policy for science and technology, institutionalizing innovation, developing incentive schemes for researchers and innovators, founding technology incubators and setting up a research database. A unit is to be created within the Higher Council for Science and Technology specifically for expatriate Jordanian scientists. The council is responsible for implementing, following up and evaluating all 24 projects, along with relevant ministries.

=== Observatory of science, technology and innovation ===
Since about 2009, the Higher Council for Science and Technology has been involved in a project that is setting up an Observatory of Science, Technology and Innovation, in collaboration with the United Nations’ Economic and Social Commission for Western Asia (ESCWA). The observatory will maintain the country's first comprehensive database of domestic research and is to be hosted by the Higher Council for Science and Technology.

=== National Innovation Strategy ===
In 2013, the Higher Council for Science and Technology published the National Innovation Strategy, 2013–2017 (despite the similarity in name, not to be confused with the Science, Technology and Innovation Policy and Strategy, 2013–2017). The National Innovation Strategy, 2013–2017 had been prepared in collaboration with the Ministry of Planning and International Cooperation, with the support of the World Bank. Targeted fields include energy, environment, health, ICTs, nanotechnology, education, engineering services, banking and clean technologies.

=== Scientific Research Support Fund ===
Jordan's Scientific Research Support Fund was revived in 2010 after being instituted in 2006. Administered by the Ministry of Higher Education and Scientific Research, it finances investment in human resources and infrastructure through competitive research grants related to ecological water management and technological applications. The fund backs entrepreneurial ventures and helps Jordanian companies to solve technical problems; it also encourages private bodies to allocate resources for R&D and provides university students with scholarships based on merit. So far, the fund has provided 13 million Jordanian dinars (circa US$18.3 million) to finance R&D projects in Jordan, 70% of which has been used to fund projects in energy, water and health care.

=== Fund for Scientific Research and Vocational Training ===
The revamped Scientific Research Support Fund is also intended to streamline the activities supported by the Fund for Scientific Research and Vocational Training (est. 1997). This fund was launched partly to ensure that all public shareholding Jordanian companies either spent 1% of their net profits on research and development or vocational training within their own structure or paid an equivalent amount into the fund for redistribution for the same purpose. After difficulties related to what the definition of research and vocational training were according to the fund, new regulations were adopted in 2010 to clarify the terms.

== Higher education ==
Jordan boasts relatively mature higher education infrastructure that includes some of the oldest universities in the Arab world. For instance, the University of Jordan was founded in 1962 and is Jordan's largest university. It claims to have 17% international students. Other universities and public and private research institutes of note in the country include:

- Jordan University of Science and Technology
  - Princess Haya Biotechnology Center
  - Jordan Research and Training Reactor
- Synchrotron-Light for Experimental Science and Applications in the Middle East
- American Center of Research
- Zarqa University

Among major science and technology events are the MENA ICT Forum, while organizations associated with higher education include the Ministry of Higher Education and Scientific Research, which issues a number of science journals.

In 1999, government spending on education was 4.94% of GDP, with higher education equating to 0.92% of GDP. There were 60,686 tertiary students in 2011. Just 12% of them (7,225) graduated in science and engineering fields that year, compared to 44% in Tunisia. In 2014, 52% of tertiary graduates in science, engineering and agriculture were women, equating to 65% of students in natural sciences, 13% of students in engineering and 74% of students in agriculture. Like other Arab governments, Jordan is setting up an observatory to monitor its innovation system. When studying the data collected, however, analysts have sometimes correlated the number of graduates or faculty and the number of researchers, despite the fact that many Arab universities are not research universities, with higher education systems in Jordan often struggling scarce resources and burgeoning student numbers, with conflict between whether to focusing time and assets on teaching or research.

== Research trends ==
=== Financial investment in research ===
The research intensity of Jordan is fairly low (0.43% of GDP in 2008), despite a growing number of public and private universities. Jordan trails the leading members of the Organisation of Islamic Cooperation for this indicator, namely Malaysia (1.07% of GDP in 2011), Turkey (0.86% of GDP in 2011), Morocco (0.73% in 2010), Egypt and Tunisia (0.68% of GDP in 2013 and 2012 respectively). Moreover, these five countries have announced their intention to raise their research intensity in coming years. Jordan was ranked 65th in the Global Innovation Index in 2025.

In many Arab states, the bulk of domestic research expenditure is performed by the government sector, followed by the higher education sector. The private sector assumes little or even no role in the research enterprise. Jordan, Morocco, Oman, Qatar, Tunisia and the United Arab Emirates are exceptions to the rule. The European Commission's Erawatch has estimated that the private sector performs one-third of research expenditure in Jordan. This compares with 30% in Morocco (2010), 29% in the United Arab Emirates (2011), 26% in Qatar (2012) and 24% in Oman (2011), according to Erawatch. The figure is closer to 20% in Tunisia, according to the UNESCO Institute for Statistics.

=== Human resources ===
In a context of rapid population growth, the number of researchers per million inhabitants is a more telling indicator of progress than sheer numbers. Jordan had 9,092 researchers (in head counts) in 2015, according to the UNESCO Institute for Statistics, a density of 1,197 researchers per million inhabitants. These figures were higher in 2008, when there were 11,310 researchers in Jordan, representing a density of 1,913 per million inhabitants.

The share of women researchers dropped between 2008 and 2015 from 22.5% to 19.7%. In 2008, women accounted for 26% of researchers in natural sciences, 18% of those in engineering, 44% of those in medical sciences, 19% of those in agricultural sciences and 32% of researchers in social sciences and humanities.

Table: Share of female Arab researchers (%)

Selected countries, in head counts

Tunisia (2008)	47.4
Egypt (2013)	42.8
Bahrain (2013)	41.2
Kuwait (2013)	37.3
Iraq (2011)	34.2
Morocco (2011)	30.2
Oman (2011)	24.9
Palestine (2010)	22.6
Jordan (2015)	19.7
Qatar (2012)	21.9
Saudi Arabia (2009)	1.4

Source: For Jordan, UNESCO Institute for Statistics. For the other countries: UNESCO Science Report: towards 2030 (2015), Figure 17.7. Note: the data on Saudi Arabia only cover one university.

=== Research output ===
Between 2005 and 2014, the number of publications catalogued in Thomson Reuters' Web of Science (Science Citation Index Expanded) climbed in almost every country in the world. In Jordan, the number rose from 641 (2005) to 1,093 (2014), with the growth rate slowing after 2008 after publications crossed the 1,000 a year threshold. With 146 publications per million inhabitants in 2014, Jordan's output in terms of scientific papers was of median level in the Arab world. It is surpassed by Qatar (548 per million), Saudi Arabia (371), Tunisia (276), Lebanon (203), Kuwait (174), the United Arab Emirates (154) and Oman (151) for this indicator.

Two-thirds of articles produced by scientists in the Arab world between 2008 and 2014 were co-authored with international partners. Jordan's closest collaborators were based in the United States of America (1,153 articles), Germany (586), Saudi Arabia (490), the United Kingdom (450) and Canada (259).

The Thomson Reuters selection of Highly Cited Researchers of 2014 listed only three Arab scientists whose ‘first’ affiliation is with a university in the Arab world. They were Prof. Ali H. Nayfeh (University of Jordan and Virginia Tech), Prof. Shaher El-Momani (University of Jordan and King Abdulaziz University in Saudi Arabia) and Prof. Salim Messaoudi (Algeria), a faculty member of King Fahd University of Petroleum and Minerals in Saudi Arabia.

The majority of patent applications in Jordan are submitted by non-residents. This pattern is found throughout the Arab world. The number of patent applications submitted by Jordanian residents remained stable between 2010 and 2012 (see table).

Table: Patent applications in Arab states, 2010–2012

For countries with more than 15 patent applications in 2012

	Patent applications by residents			Patent applications by non-residents			Total patent applications		
	2010	2011	2012	2010	2011	2012	2010	2011	2012
Egypt	605	618	683	1 625	1 591	1 528	2 230	2 209	2 211
Morocco	152	169	197	882	880	843	1034	1 049	1 040
Saudi Arabia	288	347		643	643		931	990	
Algeria	76	94	119	730	803	781	806	897	900
Tunisia	113	137	150	508	543	476	621	680	626
Jordan	45	40	48	429	360	346	474	400	394
Yemen	20	7	36	55	37	49	75	44	85
Lebanon				13	2	2	13	2	2

Source: UNESCO Science Report: towards 2030 (2015), Table 17.5

== King Abdullah II Design and Development Bureau ==
Jordan is home to the King Abdullah II Design and Development Bureau (KADDB), an independent government entity within the Jordanian Armed Forces that develops defence products and security solutions for the region. KADDB works with Jordanian universities to help students tailor their research projects to KADDB's needs.

== Information and communications technology ==
Jordan contributes 75% of the Arabic content on the Internet. The ICT sector is the fastest-growing sector in the Jordanian economy with a 25% annual growth rate. The sector accounts for more than 84,000 jobs and contributes 12% to GDP. There are 400 companies in Jordan operating across the spectrum of telecom, information technology (IT), online and mobile content, business outsourcing and video game development. It has been estimated that these subsections of the ICT industry will create over 18,000 jobs between 2015 and 2020. Roba al Assi, a Jordanian blogger who currently works at Bayt.com managing the sub-division, Bayt Communities, attributes much of the credit for Jordan's booming ICT sector to the open source community, citing groups and organizations like the Jordan Open Source Association, GeekFest and Amman Tech Tuesdays. 'What helps is that we are a country of human resources, as opposed to natural resources', he has said. 'In the absence of money and more lucrative industries, the Jordanian youth has spent the past decade building its passion for the "you can do what you want attitude" of our industry'. Al Issi adds the information technology educational structure to the list of Jordanian assets. 'Historically, most of the large web start-ups have been Jordanian in origin, like Manitoba, al-Bawaba and Jeeran,' she adds.

Jordan's ICT sector has also enjoyed the support of the monarchy. Queen Rania has touted the expansion of social media and used Twitter and YouTube to address the country.

== Energy ==
=== National energy strategy ===
Jordan imports over 95% of its energy needs, at a cost of about one-fifth of its GDP. Natural gas used to provide the bulk of Jordan's energy supply but this has changed since 2012, owing to gas supply constraints from Egypt. Jordan's electricity supply is now more than 90% reliant on heavy fuel oil and diesel. By 2015, Jordan is expected to need to generate 3,600 MWe to satisfy its energy needs, which are estimated to rise to 5000 MWe by 2020 and 8000 MWe by 2030.

To compound matters, Jordan has a water deficit of about 600 million cubic metres (m3) per year (1500 m3 demand, 900 m3 supply). It pumps about 60 million m3/yr of fossil suburbanite water from the Disi/Saq aquifer, a rate that is set to rise to 160 million m3/yr in 2013.

Jordan's 2007 national energy strategy has envisaged taking 29% of primary energy from natural gas, 14% from oil shale, 10% from renewable and 6% from nuclear by 2020.

=== Nuclear technology ===
In March 2017, the Jordan Atomic Energy Agency signed an agreement with Saudi Arabia's King Abdullah City for Atomic and Renewable Energy for a feasibility study on construction of two small modular reactors by 2020 near Qasr Amra for the production of electricity and desalinated water. Additionally, a small research reactor was inaugurated in December 2016, called the Jordan Research and Training Reactor, located at the Jordan University of Science and Technology campus in Ar-Ramtha. Its intent is to train nuclear engineers in Jordan through the existing nuclear engineering program.

=== Wind and solar energy ===
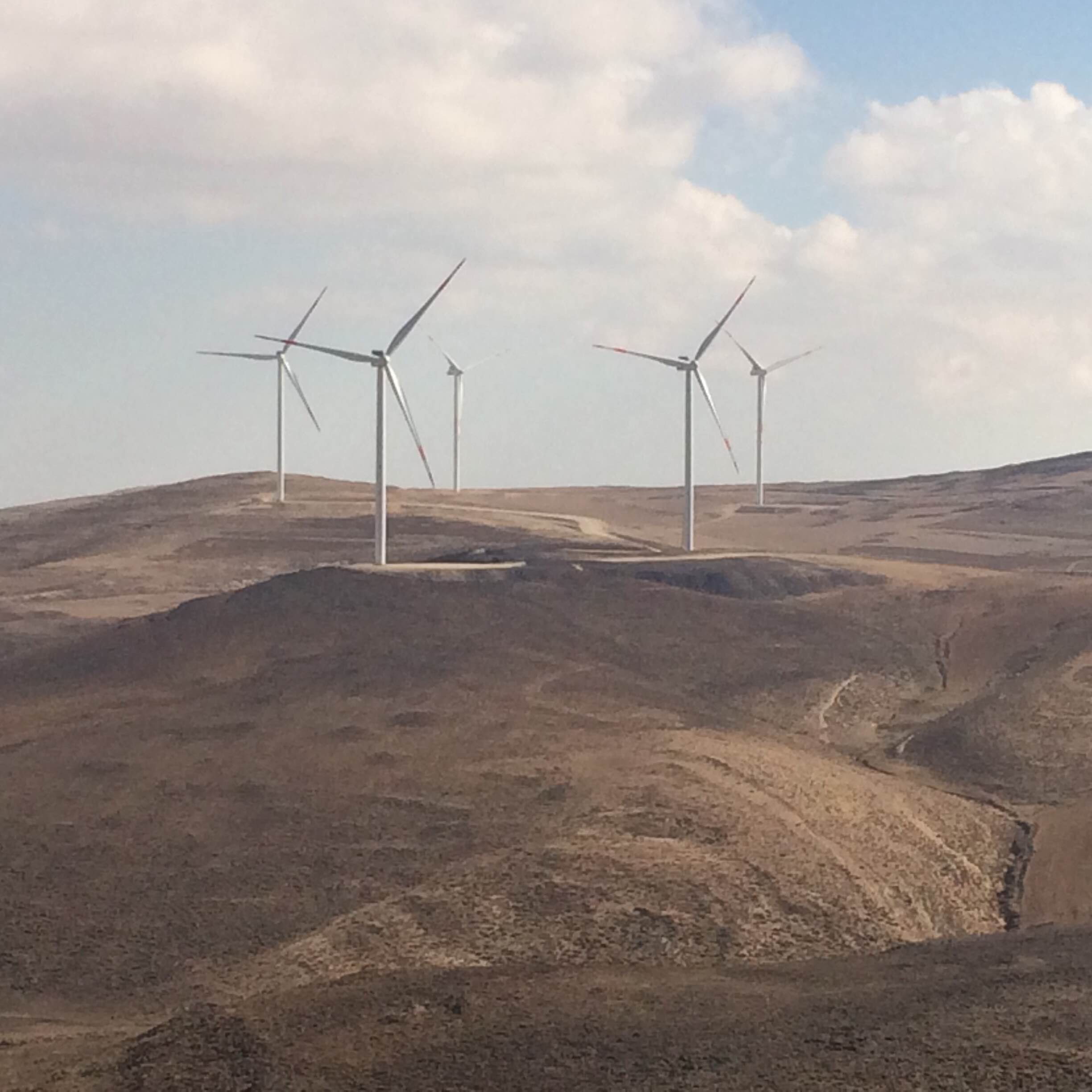
The 117 MW Tafila Wind Farm in southern Jordan is the first and largest onshore wind farm in the Middle East.

Inaugurated in December 2015, the 117 MW Tafila wind farm in Jordan was the Middle East's largest onshore wind power development at the time.

Jordan is also investing in solar energy. The National Electric Power Company, Jordan's state electricity provider, signed a power purchase agreement in October 2016 with Masdar, Abu Dhabi's renewable energy company, for the construction of a 200 MW solar plant 10 km outside Amman. The solar facility is being developed by Masdar's subsidiary, the Baynouna Solar Energy Company. Once connected to the national grid, the solar facility will supply the annual power needs of around 110,000 homes and displace an estimated 360,000 tonnes of carbon dioxide emissions each year. Masdar has selected International Finance Corporation (IFC), a member of the World Bank Group, to oversee the funding of what will be the largest solar power plant in Jordan.

The combined output of the Tafila wind farm and Baynouna solar project will account for nearly 18% of the 1.8 GW of renewable energy that Jordan plans to install by 2020.

== JY1 Cubesat ==
Jordan will launch its first nano-satellite Cubesat in February 2018, with the name of JY1; the late King Hussein's amateur radio call sign. The satellite is being constructed by university students who received a two-month internship at NASA previously, through an initiative launched by the country's Crown Prince Foundation.

== International cooperation in science and technology ==
=== Arab Strategy for Science, Technology and Innovation ===
In March 2014, the Council of Ministers of Higher Education and Scientific Research in the Arab World endorsed the draft Arab Strategy for Science, Technology and Innovation at its 14th congress in Riyadh, Saudi Arabia. The strategy has three main thrusts: academic training in science and engineering, scientific research and regional and international scientific cooperation. One of the strategy's key objectives is to involve the private sector more in regional and interdisciplinary collaboration, in order to add economic and development value to research and make better use of available expertise. Up to now, science, technology and innovation policies in Arab states have failed to catalyses knowledge production effectively or add value to products and services because they focus on developing research without taking the business community on board. There has also been a lot of talk about re-orienting the education system towards innovation and entrepreneurship but little action.

In the Arab Strategy for Science, Technology and Innovation, countries are urged to engage in greater international co-operation in 14 scientific disciplines and strategic economic sectors, including nuclear energy, space sciences and convergent technologies such as bioinformatics and nanotechnology. The Strategy advocates involving scientists from the diaspora and urges scientists to engage in public outreach; it also calls for greater investment in higher education and training to build a critical mass of experts and staunch brain drain. The Strategy nevertheless eludes some core issues, including the delicate question of who will foot the hefty bill of implementing the strategy.

=== SESAME particle accelerator ===
Jordan hosts a world-class research facility which is also fostering scientific co-operation, the Synchrotron-light for Experimental Science and Applications in the Middle East (SESAME), which was officially inaugurated on 17 May 2017 but had begun conducting experiments earlier. Construction of the center began in Allan in 2003 and was completed in 2008. The other eight members of SESAME are Bahrain, Cyprus, Egypt, Iran, Israel, Pakistan, the Palestinian Authority and Turkey. SESAME was established under the auspices of UNESCO at the turn of the century before becoming a fully independent intergovernmental organization in its own right. The center is also supported by the European Commission and by the European Organization for Nuclear Research (CERN).

Synchronous have become an indispensable tool for modern science. They work by accelerating electrons around a circular tube at high speed, during which time excess energy is given off in the form of light. The light source acts like a super X-ray machine and can be used by researchers to study everything from viruses and new drugs to novel materials and archaeological artifacts. There are about 50 such storage-ring based synchronous in use around the world. Although the majority are found in high-income countries, Brazil and China also have them.

=== Regional Center for Renewable Energy and Energy Efficiency ===
Jordan is one of the ten founding members of the Regional Center for Renewable Energy and Energy Efficiency, which was established in Cairo, Egypt, in June 2008. The centers acts as a platform for regional exchanges on policy and technical issues. It also encourages private-sector participation to promote the growth of a regional industry in renewable energy. The other eight founding partners are Algeria, Lebanon, Morocco, Libya, Palestine, Syria, Tunisia and Yemen. The center has several development partners, including the European Union, German Agency for Technical Co-operation and the Danish International Development Agency.

=== ESCWA Technology Center ===
Jordan has hosted the ESCWA Technology Center since its inception in 2011. The center's mission is ‘to assist member countries and their public and private organizations to acquire the necessary tools and capabilities to accelerate socio-economic development.

=== Islamic World Academy of Sciences ===
In 1986, a handful of scientists persuaded the Organisation of the Islamic Conference (OIC) and others in the developing world to create the Islamic World Academy of Sciences, which is headquartered in Amman, Jordan This independent, apolitical, non-governmental organization receives seed funding from Jordan and raises funds for its activities from the OIC and other international bodies, including United Nations agencies. The Islamic World Academy of Sciences combines three functions:

- a learned society that promotes the values of modern science;
- a funding agency to support outstanding scientists conducting imaginative and far-reaching research (a function not yet fully realized);
- a leader of the scientific community of OIC member countries in its relations with governments, scientific societies and academies of sciences worldwide.

=== International Continental Drilling Program ===
Within the International Continental Drilling Program, researchers from Jordan, Israel and the Palestinian Authority implemented a scientific project which entailed a deep-drilling expedition to the Dead Sea in 2010. The project involved six countries, in all.

== See also ==
- University of Jordan

== Sources ==
This article incorporates text from a free content work. Licensed under CC-BY-SA IGO 3.0. Text taken from UNESCO Science Report: towards 2030, 431-469, UNESCO, UNESCO Publishing.
