= Green Deal Ukraïna =

German–Polish–Ukrainian energy and climate policy research project

- Name: Green Deal Ukraïna (GDU)
- Type: International research and policy project
- Established: 1 June 2023
- Project period: 4 years (2023–2027)
- Coordinator: Helmholtz-Zentrum Berlin
- Countries: Germany, Poland, Ukraine
- Funding: Federal Ministry of Research, Technology and Space (BMFTR)
- Website: greendealukraina.org

Green Deal Ukraïna (GDU) is a German–Polish–Ukrainian project focused on Ukraine's energy and climate transition, energy-system security and resilience and integration into the European Union. Launched in 2023, the four-year project is coordinated by Helmholtz-Zentrum Berlin (HZB) and funded by the German Federal Ministry of Research, Technology and Space. Its work combines energy-system modelling and data analysis, policy research and advice, capacity building and institution-building, with a particular focus on supporting Ukraine's energy security, reconstruction and integration into the European Union. The project also supported the establishment of the Kyiv Energy and Climate Lab (KECLab), a joint scientific lab of HZB and the National University of Kyiv-Mohyla Academy.

== History and development ==
Green Deal Ukraïna began on 1 June 2023 as a four-year initiative coordinated by Helmholtz-Zentrum Berlin in cooperation with partners in Poland and Ukraine. The project was established in the context of Ukraine's wartime energy challenges, reconstruction needs and preparations for European Union membership.

In its first phase, GDU developed research and advisory activities on Ukraine's energy system, electricity market reform, decarbonisation, and EU energy law alignment. In parallel, it worked towards establishing a permanent research and education institution in Kyiv.

In June 2025, HZB and the National University of Kyiv-Mohyla Academy signed a memorandum of understanding on long-term cooperation in energy and climate research. In November 2025, the university established the Kyiv Energy and Climate Lab (KECLab) as a joint scientific centre with HZB. In May 2026, cooperation around KECLab expanded to include Polish research and policy institutions, strengthening the German–Polish–Ukrainian dimension of the initiative.

== Goals and key objectives ==
The project is organised around three principal areas of work:

- energy-system modelling and data analysis;
- policy analysis and advice on energy and climate policy;
- education, capacity building and institutional development.

Across these areas, GDU addresses the interaction between Ukraine's immediate energy-security needs, post-war reconstruction and the longer-term transformation required by EU integration and climate policy.

== Organisation ==
The project is coordinated by Helmholtz-Zentrum Berlin and funded by the German BMFTR, with the Polish partner being funded through its own funds.

Partner organisations in the Project Coordination Group are Forum Energii in Poland and DiXi Group and Ecoaction in Ukraine. Cooperation on training, research and policy activities has also involved other European and Ukrainian institutions.

The project is supported by an international Advisory Council of experts from European and Ukrainian energy policy, regulation, academia and research, finance and energy infrastructure. Its members include former government ministers and public officials, current and former heads of energy-sector institutions and regulatory bodies, academics and researchers, and executives of European energy and financial organisations. The Council provides strategic guidance on the project's research and policy priorities.

== Activities ==
Green Deal Ukraïna's activities are organised around three main areas.

=== Data and modelling ===
Green Deal Ukraïna develops quantitative models and datasets for analysing Ukraine's energy system and its integration with the European energy market. The project uses modelling tools including PyPSA (Python for Power System Analysis) for electricity-system modelling and LEAP (Low Emissions Analysis Platform) for longer-term energy and emissions scenarios. Its PyPSA-based models represent electricity generation, transmission, consumption and cross-border flows and have been used to study issues such as electricity imports, system adequacy and demand-side responses. GDU also maintains an online dashboard tracking generation availability, cross-border electricity flows, outages, day-ahead prices and gas-storage levels.

=== Research and policy analysis ===
GDU conducts research on Ukraine's electricity and gas systems, energy security, energy-sector governance and regulation, renewable energy, electricity-market integration, carbon pricing, decarbonisation and implementation of the EU energy and climate acquis.

External institutions have cited or used project analysis on topics including electricity-system resilience, Ukraine–EU grid integration, biomethane and energy reconstruction. In 2025, the European Bank for Reconstruction and Development stated that input from Green Deal Ukraïna and Ukrainian renewable-energy associations had contributed to the development of a planned risk-mitigation mechanism for renewable-energy investment in Ukraine.

=== Capacity building ===
Green Deal Ukraïna develops capacity-building and educational programmes for public officials, regulators, researchers, local authorities, students and energy-sector professionals, with a particular focus on the knowledge and analytical capabilities required for Ukraine's energy transition and implementation of the EU energy and climate acquis.

Since 2024, the project has implemented several training programmes, including ProGreenDeal for Policymakers, ProGreenDeal for Local Communities and ProGreenDeal: EU Accession, as well as a self-paced online course on climate policy integration in Ukraine. Participants have included representatives of Ukrainian ministries, the energy regulator, parliament, local governments, academia, think tanks, civil society and the private sector.

The programmes combine online learning and expert lectures with case studies, mentoring, simulations and in-person workshops. GDU also develops institution-specific training on demand. These activities are carried out in cooperation with institutions, including the Florence School of Regulation.

The establishment of KECLab expanded this work towards longer-term academic education and institutional capacity building in Ukraine.

== Kyiv Energy and Climate Lab ==
The Kyiv Energy and Climate Lab (KECLab) was established in November 2025 as a joint scientific laboratory of Helmholtz-Zentrum Berlin and the National University of Kyiv-Mohyla Academy.

KECLab was established to develop long-term research and education capacity in Ukraine in the fields of energy and climate policy. KECLab conducts research on energy and climate policy, including energy-system transformation and modelling, electricity markets, renewable energy, energy security, decarbonisation and Ukraine's integration into the European Union. It also develops educational programmes, including a planned master's programme in Energy and Climate and academic exchanges.

== Partnerships ==
Green Deal Ukraïna collaborates with governmental institutions, universities, research organisations and international partners in the EU, internationally and in several European countries, with foremost Germany, Poland and Ukraine. Its partners include the National University of Kyiv-Mohyla Academy, Forum Energii, DiXi Group, Ecoaction, the Florence School of Regulation, and the Kyiv School of Energy Policy.

== Selected publications ==
- Lessons from last winter: Ten measures for winter 2026/2027 (Report). Green Deal Ukraïna.
- Methane Emissions in Ukraine's Energy Sector: Underestimated Challenge and Opportunity (Report). Green Deal Ukraïna.
- Import and storage of gas in Ukraine: seeking a sustainable, long-term solution (Report). Green Deal Ukraïna.
- Critical raw materials in the energy transition: Assessing Ukraine's potential for EU supply chains (Report). Green Deal Ukraïna.
- Building Nuclear Transparency: Governance and Oversight Challenges in Energoatom (Report). Green Deal Ukraïna. (on Energoatom)
- Ukraine cross-border electricity trade: From short-term security of supply imperatives to flow-based market coupling (Report). Green Deal Ukraïna.
- CBAM's effects on Ukraine's economy & its decarbonisation efforts (Report). Green Deal Ukraïna. (on the Carbon Border Adjustment Mechanism)
