= Simon Connell =

Particle physicist in South Africa

Professor Simon Connell BSc PhD FRSSAf MASSAf FAAS
- Born: Simon Henry Connell
- Education: University of the Witwatersrand (BSc, PhD)
- Awards: British Association Medal (Silver), $S_2A_3$ (1994); Innovation and Research, NSTF (2022)
- Scientific career
- Fields: Nuclear Physics; Particle Physics; Diamond Physics; Quantum Physics; Engineering Physics; Instruments & Instrumentation
- Institutions: University of Johannesburg; ATLAS experiment, CERN; African Light Source Foundation; University of the Witwatersrand

Simon Henry Connell is a professor of physics at the University of Johannesburg in South Africa. He is an engineering physicist, a Founding Member of the South African participation in the ATLAS Experiment at CERN, and the Chair of the African Light Source (AfLS) Foundation.

== Career ==
Simon Henry Connell obtained his Bachelors' degree and PhD (1985 - 1989) in Physics from the University of the Witwatersrand. He continued to work at the University of the Witwatersrand until 2008, when he moved to University of Johannesburg. He is a professor of physics at the University of Johannesburg. He is an engineering physicist who previously worked extensively at the European Synchrotron Radiation Facility (ESRF). He is affiliated with the Faculty of Engineering and the Built Environment in the Department of Mechanical Engineering Science. Connell is a Founding Member of the South African participation in the ATLAS Experiment at CERN. Additionally, he served as the President of the South African Institute of Physics.

== Research and projects ==
According to the South African National Research Foundation, he is highly regarded and acknowledged internationally for his accomplishments. As of June 2023, he has an h-index of 141 on Google Scholar. Connell has research interests in various areas including Particle Physics, Nuclear Physics, Quantum Physics, High-Performance Computing, and Applied Nuclear Physics.

Furthermore, he has been involved in engineering and technical activities related to the Beyond Standard Model search at CERN, which is focused on High Energy Physics. Together with his group, he is involved in the searching for particles related to dark matter, presenting two potential dark vector boson candidates. Their primary objective is to identify additional candidates that could lead to a groundbreaking discovery or alternatively explain these events as background processes. His research also focuses on the development of a gamma ray laser using a specially fabricated diamond superlattice as a crystalline undulator as part of the EU-PEARL.

As the leader of the Mining Positron Emission Technology (MinPET) Research Group, Connell has successfully demonstrated the ability to detect diamonds within kimberlite at a statistically significant level. Moreover, he has utilised high-rate, high-sensitivity detectors developed for this project to investigate fluid-flow in hydro-cyclones. Connell is also engaged in an inter-departmental collaboration to build the national case for South African Advanced High-Temperature Gas Cooled Reactors. His particular interest lies in combining Monte Carlo among other methods with advanced computing solutions to model neutrons in the nuclear reactor core.

=== African Light Source ===
Connell is actively involved in the African Light Source (AfLS) project as the AfLS Foundation's Chair. Connell has contributed to the development and promotion of the AfLS, advocating for the establishment of this facility in Africa. He has co-authored papers and articles discussing the importance and potential impact of the African Light Source. In addition, Simon Connell has given presentations and talks about the African Light Source project. The African Light Source is an initiative aimed at establishing Africa's first synchrotron light source, a particle accelerator that produces intense radiation used for studying the structure and behavior of matter. The project aims to bridge the gap in synchrotron light source capabilities on the continent, as Africa currently lacks such a facility. By establishing the African Light Source, African scientists would have access to a powerful tool for conducting cutting-edge research in various scientific disciplines. The project has gained momentum and support from the scientific community.

== Awards and honours ==
Connell was elected a Fellow of the Royal Society of South Africa in 2006, a Member of the Academy of Science of South Africa, and a Fellow of the African Academy of Sciences in 2018. Connel received the British Association Medal (Silver) from the South Africa Association of the Advancement of Science ($S_2A_3$) in 1994, and the National Science and Technology Forum (NSTF)'s Awards for Innovation and Research and/or Development: Corporate Organisation in 2022 for leading the MinPET project.

In 2025, Connell received the John Wheatley Award with Gihan Kamel and Sekazi Mtingwa.
