= African Light Source =

Conceptual Pan-African synchrotron light source

The African Light Source (AfLS) – as of May 2024 – is the initiative to build the first Pan-African synchrotron light source. The initiative is currently led – separately – by the African Light Source Foundation and the Africa Synchrotron Initiative (ASI). The aim of this initiative is to establish an advanced synchrotron light source on the African continent, generating intense beams of X-rays, ultraviolet, and infrared light for scientific research and innovation.

== Rationale ==
There are more than 70 synchrotron light sources, including about 30 high and medium energy synchrotrons, scattered globally but Africa is the only continent without any synchrotron light source facility. Likewise, there is a growing need for innovation to address the challenges that impact the lives of many Africans today. Meeting these challenges calls for investment in science, technology and innovation, including large-scale research infrastructure. To help answer this need, the idea for an African light source has been discussed at least since 2000.

The establishment of a synchrotron light source in Africa has significant potential for scientific progress and socioeconomic development. Synchrotron facilities play a vital role in fundamental, applied, and industrial research, driving technological advancements and fostering collaborations across boundaries. By becoming a player in the field of light sources, Africa can contribute to the global scientific endeavour and promote a culture of enlightenment, diversity, and innovation.

African scientists and nations participate in the European Synchrotron Radiation Facility (ESRF) and Sesame light source, respectively. Such participation provides access to the facilities for researchers, and capacity building and training across many aspects of synchrotron operation and technologies. In December 2017, Diamond Light Source, UK, established the Synchrotron Techniques for African Research and Technology (START) with a £3.7 million funded by the UK Research and Innovation for 3 years. START aimed to provide access to African researchers with focus on energy materials and structural biology.

== Leaders ==
=== African Light Source Foundation ===
The African Light Source Foundation, along with its partner organisations, is actively working towards the realisation of this project. The foundation has a defined mandate and roadmap that envisions a 10-15 year timeline for the construction of the actual facility. Young scientists and researchers have opportunities to contribute to the project and join the efforts of the African Light Source Foundation.

In November 2015, the First AfLS Conference was held with 98 delegates from 13 African nations at the European Synchrotron Radiation Facility (ESRF), Grenoble, France. The conference led to the Grenoble Resolutions which encapsulate the formation of the AfLS Steering Committee, AfLS Roadmap, and the creation of the AfLS Foundation, registered in South Africa. The AfLS Foundation is chaired by Simon Connell and has received support by Nana Akufo-Addo, Ghana president, who is championing the project. Since the first conference, and as of August 2023, there have been four further conferences. The AfLS Foundation is actively working upon the Conceptual Design Report (CDR) for a light source in Africa.

The African Light Source Foundation is supported by the African Physical Society, the African Astronomical Society, the African Institute of Planetary and Space Sciences, the African Optics and Photonics Society, the African Society for Nanosciences and Nanotechnologies, the Federation of African Societies of Chemistry, the Federation for African Societies of Biochemistry and Molecular Biology, the African Geographical Society, African materials Research Society, the BioStruct-Africa, the Federation of African Immunological Societies, and the Federation of African Medical Physics Organization.

=== Africa Synchrotron Initiative ===
In 2018, during the 32nd African Union meeting, in Addis Ababa, the African Union's executive council called on its member states to support a pan-African synchrotron. Subsequently, the committee for Africa Synchrotron Initiative (ASI) was formed in 2019 by the African Academy of Sciences (AAS), chaired by Shaaban Khalil. The African Synchrotron Initiative (ASI) had their first meeting on 20 January 2022.

== Challenges ==
=== Funding ===
One of the significant problems with the African Light Source initiative is the need for substantial financial investment. Scientists estimate that around $1 billion is required to establish the synchrotron light source. The ability of African nations to fund the project has been questioned since they struggle to fund national projects, especially considering the economic disparities and competing priorities in African countries.

=== Infrastructure and expertise ===
Building and operating a synchrotron light source require specialised infrastructure and a highly skilled workforce. Africa currently lacks the necessary infrastructure and expertise in accelerator physics and related fields. To meet the infrastructure and expertise requirements for the AfLS, it was suggested by Marcus et al. that African scientists make greater use of existing overseas national light source facilities, dedicated African beamlines or remote access beamtime, similar to the UK STAR program.

=== Collaboration and governance ===
The African Light Source initiative involves multiple organisations, including the AfLS Foundation and the Africa Synchrotron Initiative (ASI). As of June 2023, the two organisations (AfLS foundation and ASI) are not merging their efforts which makes governance a challenge since there are members who are part of the two organisations. Sarah Wild asserted that ensuring effective collaboration and coordination among these organisations, as well as establishing a robust governance structure, can be complex and may pose challenges. However, according to Marcus et al., to ensure effective governance of the African Light Source (AfLS), it is recommended to involve regional and pan-African stakeholders as full members in the governing bodies of national light source facilities. This approach will not only foster the development of governance expertise but also raise awareness of the AfLS within these bodies.

=== Sustainability and operational costs ===
Once established, operating a synchrotron light source involves substantial ongoing costs, that is estimated at $100 million, for annual running costs for maintenance, electricity, and personnel. Ensuring the long-term sustainability of the facility and securing funding for operational costs can be a recurring challenge.

=== Prioritisation of resources ===
Sarah Wild argues that while the African Light Source initiative has the potential to advance scientific research, it may not be the most pressing priority for African countries. Limited resources could be better utilised to address more immediate and critical challenges, such as healthcare, education, poverty reduction, and infrastructure development.
