= Sandra Díaz (ecologist) =

Argentine ecologist

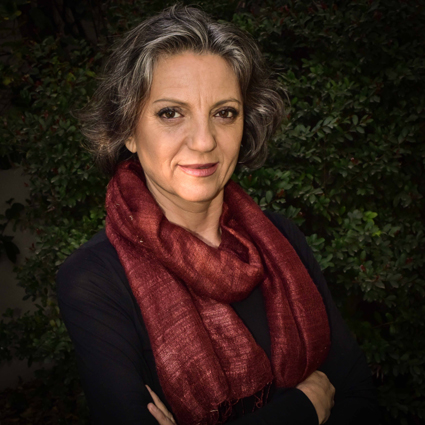
- Dra. Sandra Myrna Díaz
- Born: Sandra Myrna Díaz
- Education: National University of Córdoba
- Known for: Plant biodiversity
- Awards: Ramon Margalef Prize in Ecology (2017); Foreign Member of the Royal Society (2019); Princess of Asturias Awards (2019); Kew International Medal (2020); BBVA Frontiers of Knowledge in Ecology and Conservation Award (2021); Diamond Konex Award (2023)
- Scientific career
- Fields: Community ecology Plant functional traits Functional diversity Global environmental change Social benefits of biodiversity
- Workplaces: Instituto Multidisciplinario de Biología Vegetal, CONICET & National University of Córdoba; University of Sheffield
- Website: www.nucleodiversus.org/index.php?mod=page&id=39&lang=en

Sandra Myrna Díaz ForMemRS (born in 1961) is an Argentine ecologist and professor of ecology at the National University of Córdoba, who has been awarded with the Linnean Medal for her scientific work. She studies the functional traits of plants and investigates how plants impact the ecosystem.

Díaz is a senior member of the National Scientific and Technical Research Council and the National Academy of Sciences of Argentina. She is one of the 1% most cited scientists in the world. She was elected a Foreign Member of the Royal Society (ForMemRS) in 2019 and an international member of the American Philosophical Society in 2022.

== Early life and education ==
Díaz was born in Bell Ville in the province of Córdoba, Argentina. Her parents loved plants and she grew up in a home with big gardens.

Díaz attended the National University of Córdoba and graduated cum laude with a biology degree in 1984. She decided that she wanted to be an environmental scientist, and chose to pursue graduate research. She remained at National University of Córdoba for her doctoral, earning a PhD in biological sciences in 1989. She worked with Marcelo Cabido and Alicia Acosta on plant functional traits. During her PhD and later research Díaz developed the protocols to support scientists using functional traits to interpret ecosystems. Díaz was a fellow at CONICET, the center for ecology and natural resources.

== Career and research ==
After reading a book by J. Philip Grime about the connection between plant strategies, ecosystem processes and environmental factors, Díaz applied to work with him in the United Kingdom. In 1991 Díaz joined the University of Sheffield as a postdoctoral research associate.

At Sheffield she studied how plant communities respond to increasing quantities of carbon dioxide (CO_{2}). She was the first to demonstrate an important feedback between plants and soil microbes under elevated carbon dioxide. She found that, even in the presence of fertilizer, weedy plants that grow quickly suffer from heightened levels of carbon dioxide. At the same time, microorganisms in the soil thrived in high levels of carbon dioxide, indicating that there is a competition between plants and soil for nitrogen. Diaz also showed that slow-growing plants have a more positive feedback mechanism.

Díaz returned to Argentina in 1993, where she moved back into studying plant traits. She was a principal lead author to the chapter on "Rangelands in a Changing Climate: Impacts, Adaptations, and Mitigation" in the 1995 report of the Intergovernmental Panel on Climate Change (IPCC). Díaz founded the Núcleo DiverSus de Investigaciones en Diversidad y Sustentatibilidad.

She has played an important role in the development and implementation of functional biodiversity. As part of CONICET Díaz developed a new methodology to quantify the functional biodiversity of plants. This tool allows scientists to evaluate the effect of biodiversity of plants and its impact on ecosystems. Díaz was the first to provide a global picture of the functional diversity of vascular plants. She designed a database of tens of thousands of plants, using contributions of 135 scientists.

She explored functional trait diversity on plots of land, dividing vegetation into separate sections to simulate changes in climate and land use. She demonstrated that there exists a tradeoff in plant design between the fast acquisition of resources and the conservation of the resources in tissues. Plant designs can include the lifetime of their leaves, whether they grow quickly or slowly, how they reproduce and what kind of wood they have. In 2016, she presented the global spectrum of plant form and function, the first global picture plant essential functional diversity.

Díaz is also interested in the interaction between ecology and the social sciences, and looks at how societies value and support ecosystems and in the relationship between living plants and people. She published a mechanistic framework for connecting functional diversity in 2007, a paper which would go on to win the Proceedings of the National Academy of Sciences of the United States of America (PNAS) Cozzarelli Prize. She used this methodology in real-world systems, and assembled a team of social scientists and ecologists. Social scientists worked with communities to understand what they want from a particular ecosystem, and ecologists studied functional diversity and the relevant ecosystem processes. She has spearheaded the inclusive concept of nature’s contributions to people now used by Intergovernmental Science-Policy Platform on Biodiversity and Ecosystem Services (IPBES) and the Kunming-Montreal Global Biodiversity Framework of the Convention on Biological Diversity.

Clarivate Analytics reported that Díaz was one of the most highly cited environmental scientists in the world. She has been a Co-Chair of the Global Assessment of the Intergovernmental Science-Policy Platform on Biodiversity and Ecosystem Services (IPBES). The IPBES Global Assessment was carried out by more than 150 scientists worldwide.

== Other activities ==
In 2023, Díaz was appointed by United Nations Secretary General António Guterres to the United Nations' Scientific Advisory Board.

== Recognition ==
Díaz was listed as one of the ten people who mattered in science in 2019 by the journal Nature in their end of year review In 2023 she was one of the six women chosen by Nature to comment on their plans for International Women's Day. The others were Gihan Kamel, Martina Anto-Ocrah, Jess Wade, Aster Gebrekirstos and Tanya Monro.

=== Awards and honours ===
Díaz' awards and honours include:

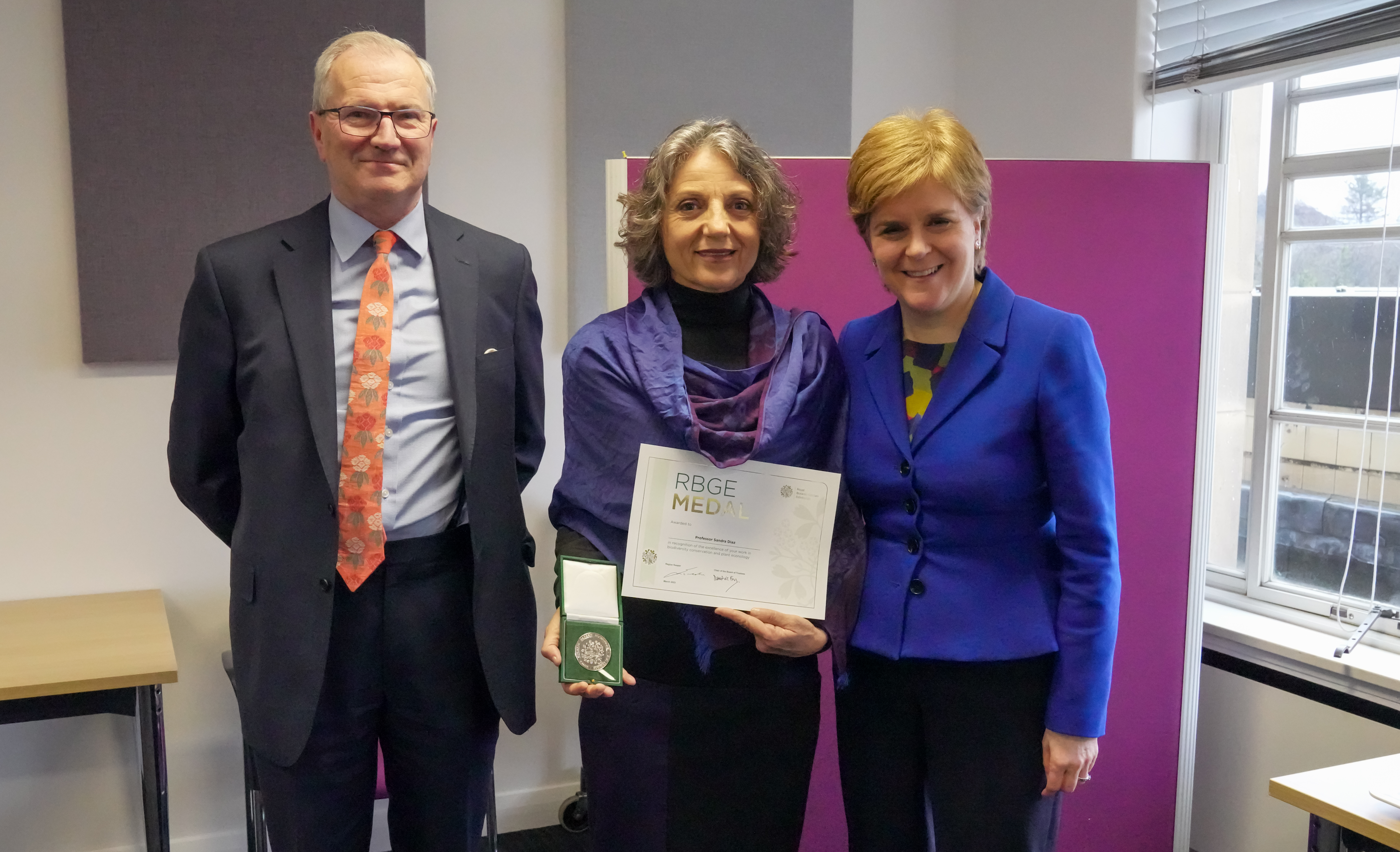
Sandra Díaz receiving the Royal Botanic Garden Edinburgh Medal from the Scottish First Minister, Nicola Sturgeon on 13 March 2023

- 2008 Ecological Society of America Sustainability Award
- 2008 Proceedings of the National Academy of Sciences of the United States of America (PNAS) Cozzarelli Prize
- 2009 Elected member of the National Academy of Sciences
- 2012 Inaugural Fellow of the Ecological Society of America
- 2013 Platinum Konex Award in Biology and Ecology
- 2014 Bernardo Houssay Award in Biological Sciences
- 2014 Honorary member award of the British Ecological Society (BES)
- 2017 Ramon Margalef Prize in Ecology
- 2018 Nominated by Nature's 10 as one of five ones to watch in 2019.
- 2019 Princess of Asturias Awards
- 2019 Elected a Foreign Member of the Royal Society (ForMemRS)
- 2019 Royal Norwegian Society of Sciences and Letters Gunnerus Award
- 2020 BBVA Foundation Frontiers of Knowledge Award in the category "Ecology and Conservation Biology".
- 2022 Elected an international member of the American Philosophical Society
- 2022 Awarded the 13th Kew International Medal by Kew Royal Botanic Gardens
- 2023 Royal Botanic Garden Edinburgh Medal from the Scottish First Minister, Nicola Sturgeon
- 2023 Platinum Konex Award in Ecology and Environmental Sciences
- 2023 Diamond Konex Award in Science and Technology
- 2023 Linnean Medal awarded by the Linnean Society of London
- 2025 Tyler Prize for Environmental Achievement
