= Synchrotron-Light for Experimental Science and Applications in the Middle East =

International research facility

Coordinates: 32°06′36″N 35°44′12″E

SESAME

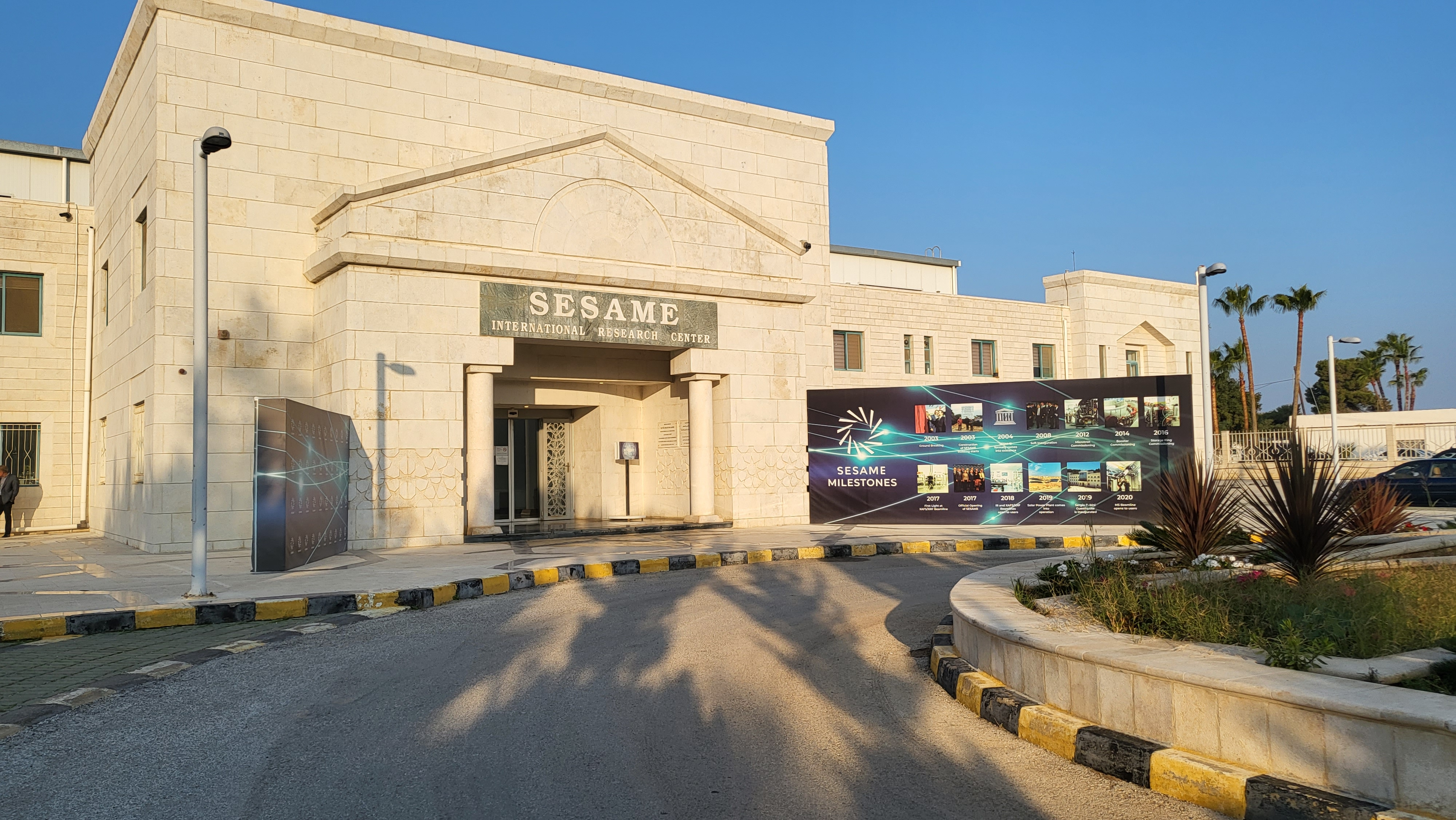
- SESAME, entrance to the main hall
- Established: 16 May 2017
- Research type: Synchrotron light
- Budget: $6 million
- President: Rolf Heuer (as of May 2017)
- Director: Khaled Toukan
- Staff: 50
- Location: Al Balqa, Jordan
- Operating agency: CERN; Jordan Atomic Energy Commission
- Website: sesame.org.jo

The Synchrotron-Light for Experimental Science and Applications in the Middle East (SESAME) is an independent laboratory located in Allan in the Balqa governorate of Jordan, created under the auspices of UNESCO on 30 May 2002.

Aimed at promoting peace between Middle Eastern countries, Jordan was chosen as the location for the laboratory, as it was then the only country that maintained diplomatic relations with all the other founding members: Bahrain, Cyprus, Egypt, Iran, Israel, Pakistan, the Palestinian Authority, and Turkey. The idea, to create a joint Arab-Israeli scientific collaboration, goes back to the 1980s and took a more concrete form in discussions at CERN in 1993. The project was launched in 1999 and the ground breaking ceremony was held on 6 January 2003. Construction work began the following July, and the facility was finally inaugurated on 16 May 2017 under the patronage and presence of King Abdullah II.

The construction of the project cost around $98 million, with $5 million donated each by Jordan, Israel, Turkey, Iran, and the European Union. The rest was donated by CERN from existing equipment. Jordan became the greatest contributor to the project by donating land and building construction costs, and by pledging to build a $7 million solar power plant, which will make SESAME the first accelerator in the world to be powered by renewable energy. The annual operational cost of $6 million are pledged by the members according to the size of their economies.

The facility is the only synchrotron radiation facility in the Middle East and is one of around 60 in the world. As of May 2017, the president of the SESAME Council is Rolf Heuer. He was preceded by Christopher Llewellyn Smith (2008-2017) and Herwig Schopper (2004-2008). All three were previously directors-general of CERN. Khaled Toukan, the chairman of the Jordan Atomic Energy Commission, is the current director and former vice-president of SESAME.

== Background ==
Synchrotron light (also referred to as synchrotron radiation) is radiation that is emitted when charged particles moving at speeds near the speed of light are forced to change direction by a magnetic field. It is the brightest artificial source of X-rays, allowing for the detailed study of molecular structures. When synchrotrons were first developed, their primary purpose was to accelerate particles for the study of the nucleus. Today, there are almost 60 synchrotron light sources around the world dedicated to exploiting the special qualities, which allow it to be used across a wide range of applications, from condensed matter physics to structural biology, environmental science and cultural heritage.

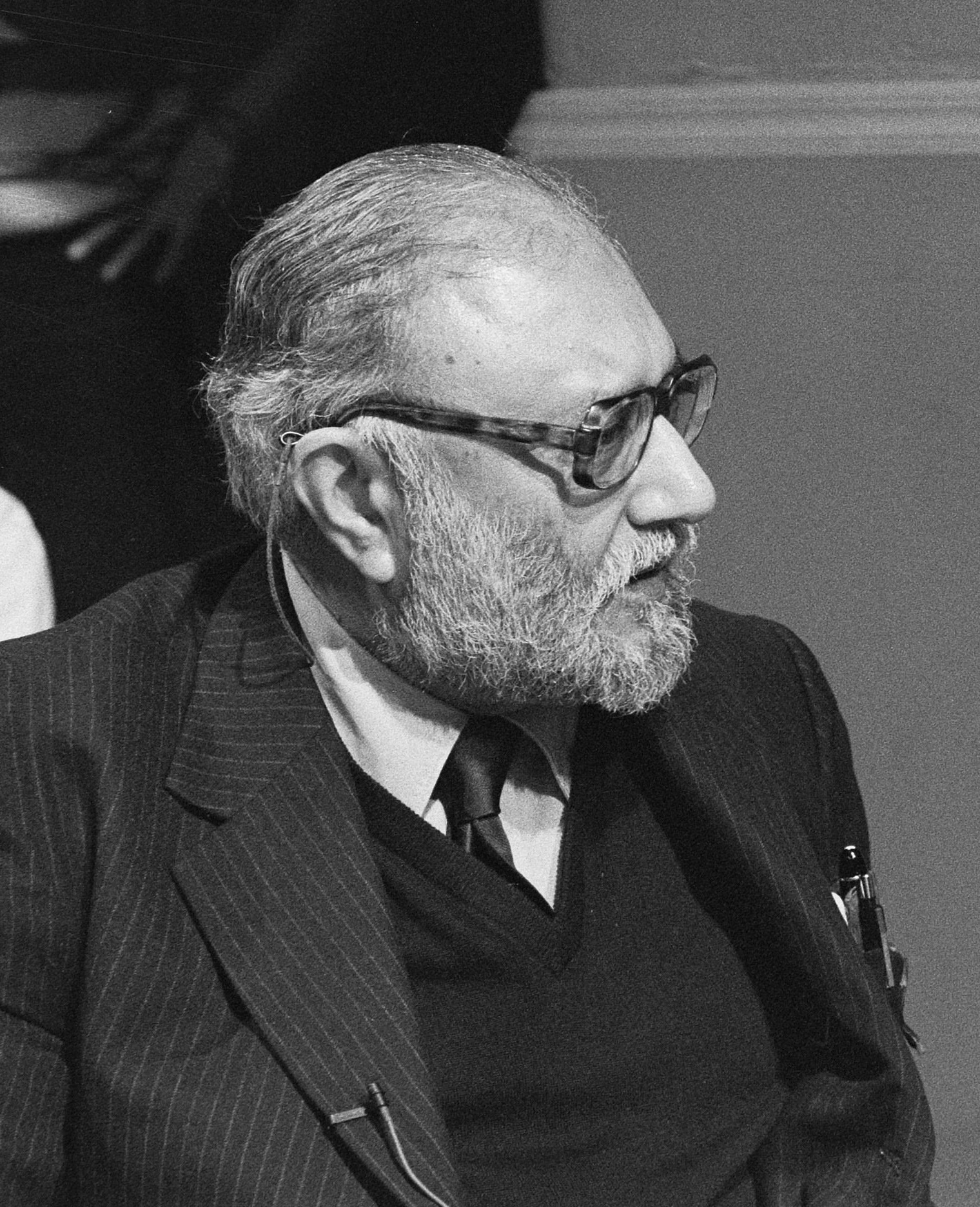
Mohammad Abdus Salam

== History ==
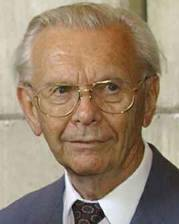
Herwig Schopper

The need for a large-scale scientific project to bring the Middle-East back into the scientific community as well as promote peace and foster international collaboration has been recognised for almost 40 years. In his speech at the 1979 Nobel Prize banquet, Pakistani physicist Mohammad Abdus Salam stated that we should "strive to provide equal opportunities to all so that they can engage in the creation of Physics and science for the benefit of all mankind".

In his paper presented at the Symposium on the "Future Outlook of the Arabian Gulf University", on 11 May 1983, in Bahrain, titled The Gulf University and Science in the Arab-Islamic Commonwealth, Abdus Salam proposed the founding of a Super Gulf University and an international laboratory in material sciences in Bahrain. Such a laboratory was proposed for the University of Jeddah, to emphasise science and technology transfer in the material sciences, including a laboratory with a synchrotron radiation light source. Ultimately, the proposal did not come through, possibly because it had the sponsorship of a single university rather than a consortium of universities.

In 1997, Herman Winick and Gustav-Adolf Voss suggested building a light source in the Middle-East using components from the soon-to-be decommissioned BESSY I facility in Berlin, during two seminars organized in 1997 in Italy and in 1998 in Sweden by Tord Ekelöf with the CERN-based Middle East Scientific Co-operation (MESC) group headed by Sergio Fubini. Winick was credited with the idea of moving the machine to the Middle-East during discussions about the future of the machine. He explained "(his) main motivation is to help create a project in which people can work constructively and collectively."

This proposal was adopted and pursued by MESC. The German government agreed to donate the necessary equipment at the request of Fubini and Herwig Schopper. Believing that the only chance of realizing such a project was following the example of CERN, the plan was brought to the attention of Federico Mayor, then Director-General of UNESCO, who organized the Consultative Meeting on a Middle East Synchrotron Light Facility, at UNESCO headquarters in Paris in June 1999. The meeting resulted in the launching of the project and the establishment of an International Interim Council under the chairmanship of Herwig Schopper.

In May 2002, the executive board and Director General of UNESCO unanimously approved the establishment of the Centre under UNESCO auspices, through resolution 31C/Resolution 19.

The groundbreaking ceremony for SESAME took place at Al-Balqa' Applied University in Jordan, on 6 January 2003. SESAME used offices at the UNESCO Office in Amman until the completion of the building in 2008.

In April 2004, the centre formally came into existence when the required number of Members had informed UNESCO of their decision to join. and a permanent Council was established. The founding members were Bahrain, Egypt, Israel, Jordan, Pakistan, and Turkey. The current Members are Cyprus, Egypt, Iran, Israel, Jordan, Pakistan, the Palestinian Authority, and Turkey. The Observers are Brazil, Canada, China, the European Union, France, Germany, Greece, Italy, Japan, Kuwait, Portugal, Russia, Spain, Switzerland, Sweden, the United Kingdom, and the United States.

SESAME was officially opened on 16 May 2017 by King Abdullah II of Jordan.

=== Early Criticism ===
The German and French Ambassadors to UNESCO complained that Kōichirō Matsuura, then Director General of UNESCO, had not followed UNESCO protocol while making this decision. Schopper explained the difficult circumstances the project was facing and they withdrew their complaints. Matsuura did not need formal approval to provide the required funds because the Japanese government had given him a budget to be used at his discretion when he was appointed Director General.

SESAME faced a further setback when the German government was asked to withdraw the authorization of export of BESSY I after public criticism was raised because some scientists claimed that it is possible to produce nuclear materials for atomic bombs with SESAME. Schopper was invited to a televised discussion with Professor Dr. Reinhard Brandt, one of the scientists who made the critical claims. The objections were eventually resolved, as Schopper explained that although some plutonium could have been produced, it would not have been a sufficient amount to develop a bomb. The BESSY I components were eventually shipped from Berlin to Hamburg and then to the Zarqa Free Zone in Jordan, where they were held by the Jordanian government until SESAME was formally founded and the building was ready to accept the components.

== Location ==
Before UNESCO could formally approve SESAME, the issue of finding a host country and a site had to be resolved. The Interim Council agreed on a set of criteria which had to be satisfied by the host country and site. The lab had to be accessible, geographically and politically, to scientists from all over the world, and the host state should be strongly committed to the project, and should provide the land on which the lab would be based for free, as well as provide the building itself and the technical infrastructure (roads, water, electricity).

Seven Members (Armenia, Egypt, Iran, Jordan, Oman, Palestine and Turkey) proposed 12 sites. UNESCO Assistant Director General for Natural Sciences, Maurizio Iaccarino, and Schopper visited Egypt, Israel, Jordan and Palestine in September 1999. The Armenian, Iranian and Turkish proposals were explored at Interim Council Meetings.

Although Egypt expressed strong interest in the project, a long procedure which involved going through many authorities was necessary before the project could be presented to the Prime Minister, and the proposal was ultimately deemed unfit. The Palestinian National Authority, although interested in the project, did not have the financial capacity to meet the Interim Council's criteria. For political reasons, Israel could not provide a site accessible to all scientists. Additionally, Israel was already heavily involved in the ESRF laboratory at Grenoble, and were contractually bound to provide considerable funds. Furthermore, biologists did not see how they would benefit from SESAME since they already had access to other laboratories across the world. Armenia offered to host SESAME in their building Synchrotron Laboratory at Erevan since their accelerator was outdated. Their proposal was strengthened with the backing of wealthy Iraqi-born Armenian-American businessman Kevork Hovnanian. However, it was later realized that several alterations to the building were necessary to make it a viable site for SESAME. Iran, considered a rogue state at the time, though interested in the project, could not guarantee access to scientists from all countries, and so the proposal was ultimately unsuccessful.

=== Approving Jordan ===
In Jordan, Adnan Badran, deputy director of UNESCO from 1992 to 1998, organised a meeting with representatives from universities and other organisations. No government members could be met, and no commitment was obtained. In a last ditch effort to save the project, Schopper contacted his former student Isa Khubeis, then vice-president of Al-Balqa Applied University. Khubeis invited Iaccarino and Schopper to dinner along with Khaled Toukan, President of Al-Balqa University, and Prince Ghazi Bin Muhammad, who chairman of the Board of Governors of the university and a close advisor of King Abdullah II. Schopper explained the situation to Prince Ghazi, who arranged a meeting with King Abdullah for the following day. King Abdullah formally committed Jordan to the project during the meeting in a signed letter addressed to the Director General of UNESCO.

After long discussions and a series of votes, Jordan was formally approved to be the host of the Centre at the third meeting of the SESAME Interim Council in June 2000. Egypt and Iran withdrew their proposals before the final round of voting. The decision was ratified by 9 votes in favour and 1 abstention. Jordan was seen as an appropriate location for the project because it was the only country at the time to have maintained diplomatic relations with all other founding members: Bahrain, Cyprus, Egypt, Iran, Israel, Pakistan, the Palestinian Authority, and Turkey.

== Cost ==
The project cost around $98 million, with $5 million donated each by Jordan, Israel, Turkey, Iran and the European Union. The rest was in kind donations of equipment by CERN, and land by Jordan (the largest contributor to the project). Jordan also contributed the building construction costs, and a $7 million solar power plant, making SESAME the first accelerator in the world powered solely by renewable energy. The annual operational cost of $6 million is split between the members, according to the sizes of their economies.

== Funding ==
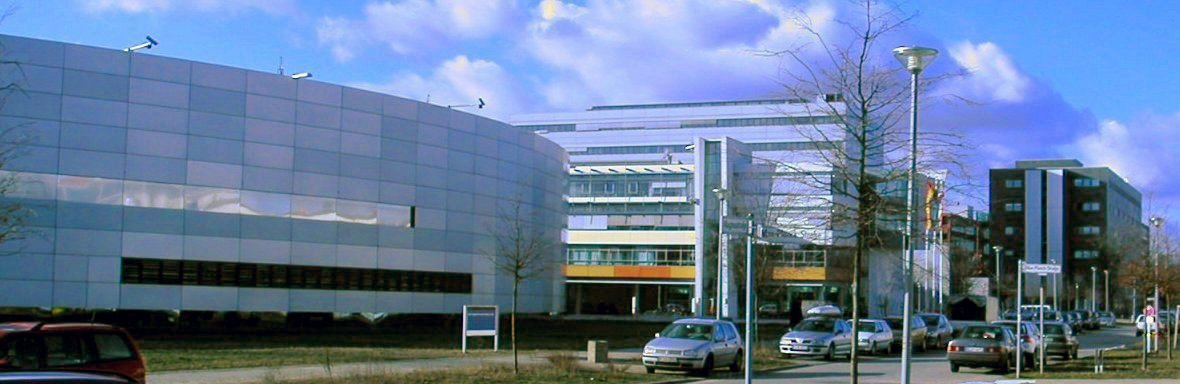
The BESSY facility in Berlin

As well as the drawn-out process in deciding which country should host SESAME, the project came across several other difficulties on its path to completion. Possibly the largest issue was its funding. Because the major components of the laboratory from the decommissioned BESSY I experiment, originally valued at $60 million, were being donated by the German government, funding on that front was not an issue. However, the German government stipulated that the cost of dismantling, including documentation, packing and transport, had to be provided by SESAME. The cost was an estimated $600,000, and had to be guaranteed before the end of 1999 because the BESSY building had been promised to the Max Planck Society. Schopper had been informed of this condition only a few hours before the Interim Council meeting, and asking for voluntary contributions would have been ineffective because most delegates at the meeting would not have had the authority to make financial decision. After a discussion between the Interim Council, the United States State Department, Sweden and Russia agreed to provide $200,000. Schopper saw only one possible option to save the project. He asked UNESCO Director General Koichiro Matsuura to arrange an emergency meeting. They had a lunch together, and Schopper asked Matsuura to fund the missing $400,000 immediately. Matsuura agreed to the request and the Interim Council Members were informed after the lunch.

Because the BESSY components were used only as an injector system, the construction of a new main ring was still needed for SESAME. The estimated cost of the ring was $10 million so additional sources of funding were required. On 23 July 2001 a formal proposal supported by the German and French Ministers of Research, and later the Commissioner for Research Philippe Busquin, was submitted to European Commissioner Chris Patten. In October 2001 chef de cabinet of Commissioner Patten, Anthony Cary, informed Schopper that an independent evaluation by a panel of international experts was needed. The Techno-Economic Feasibility Study was under the guidance of Professor Guy Le Lay of the University of Marseille. The report concluded that the project was promising and would "effectively stimulate scientific activity and cooperation in the Middle East". However, in August 2003, Commissioner Patten stated that "the Commission is not in a position at this stage to provide Community funding to SESAME". In a subsequent meeting arranged between the Jordanian government, SESAME representatives and the EU Commission, the main of contention was the project's energy level. It was claimed that a competitive facility needed a higher energy level. A compromise was reached that the machine should start at 2 GeV, with 2.5 GeV available at a later stage. This would have increased the cost of the ring by another $2 million.

The issue was eventually resolved through negotiations started by Director General Rolf Heuer between CERN and the Commissioner for Research and Innovation, Carlos Moedas. About $5 million were approved for CERN to be used for the construction of the magnets of the SESAME main ring.

The Sergio Fubini Guesthouse that was inaugurated in December 2019 was funded by the Government of Italy represented by the Ministry for Education, University and Research through INFN.

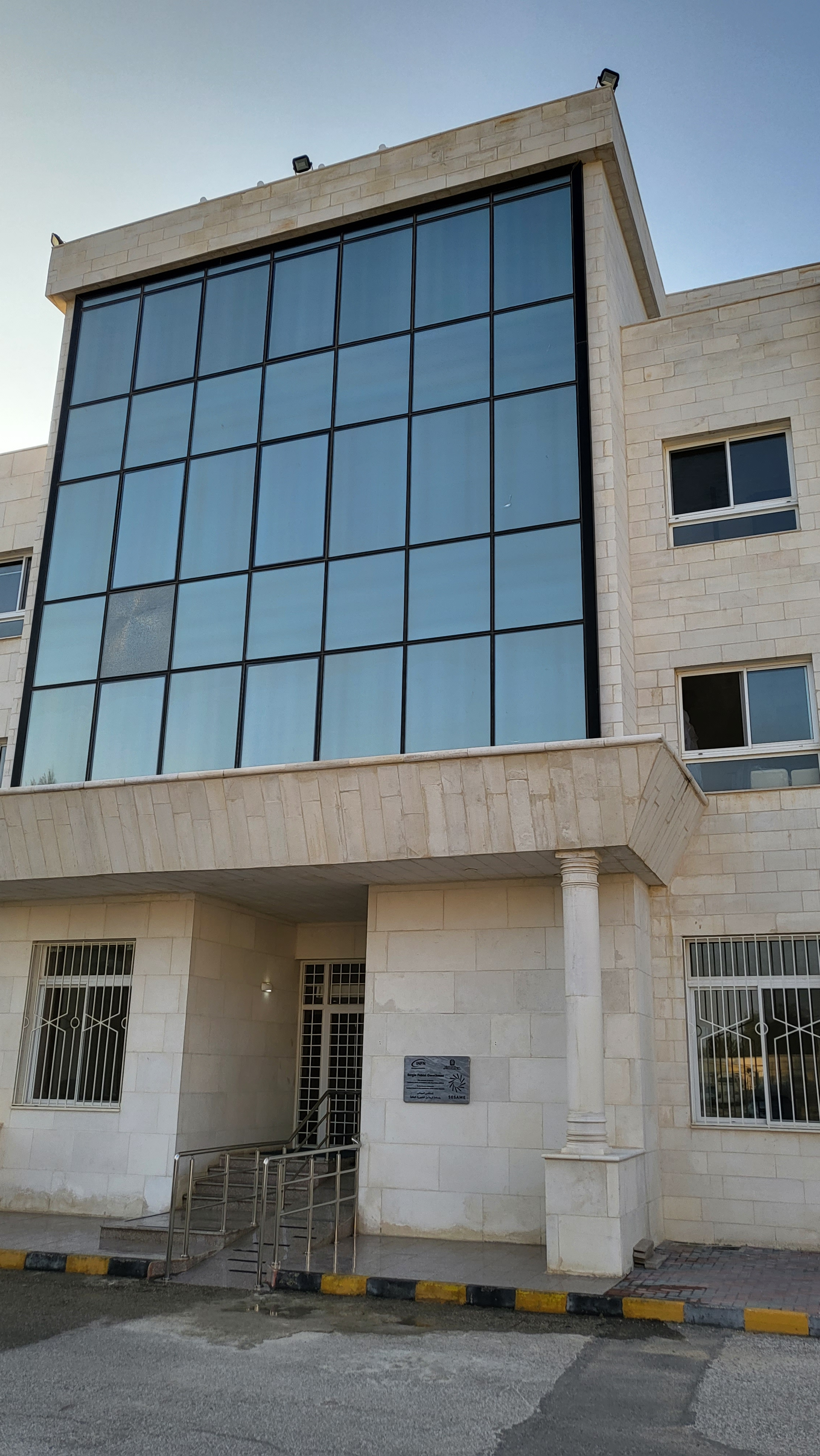
Sergio Fubini Guesthouse at SESAME

== Design ==
The machine works in four stages.

=== Microtron ===
The microtron accelerates electrons to the energy of 22.5 MeV, and injects them into the booster. It was fully operational in November 2011.

=== Booster synchrotron ===
The booster synchrotron receives electrons from the microtron, and accelerates them to 800 MeV, for injection into the storage ring. The booster was created with parts from the German synchrotron facility BESSY, which was decommissioned in 1999.

=== Storage ring ===
The storage ring accelerates electrons to 2.5 GeV, and keeps them circulating for as long as two hours. As the electrons go around the storage ring, they emit x-rays. Lost energy is replaced as the beam travels through radio frequency cavities along the ring.

=== Beamlines ===
X-rays from the storage ring are directed to beamlines, where research experiments are performed.

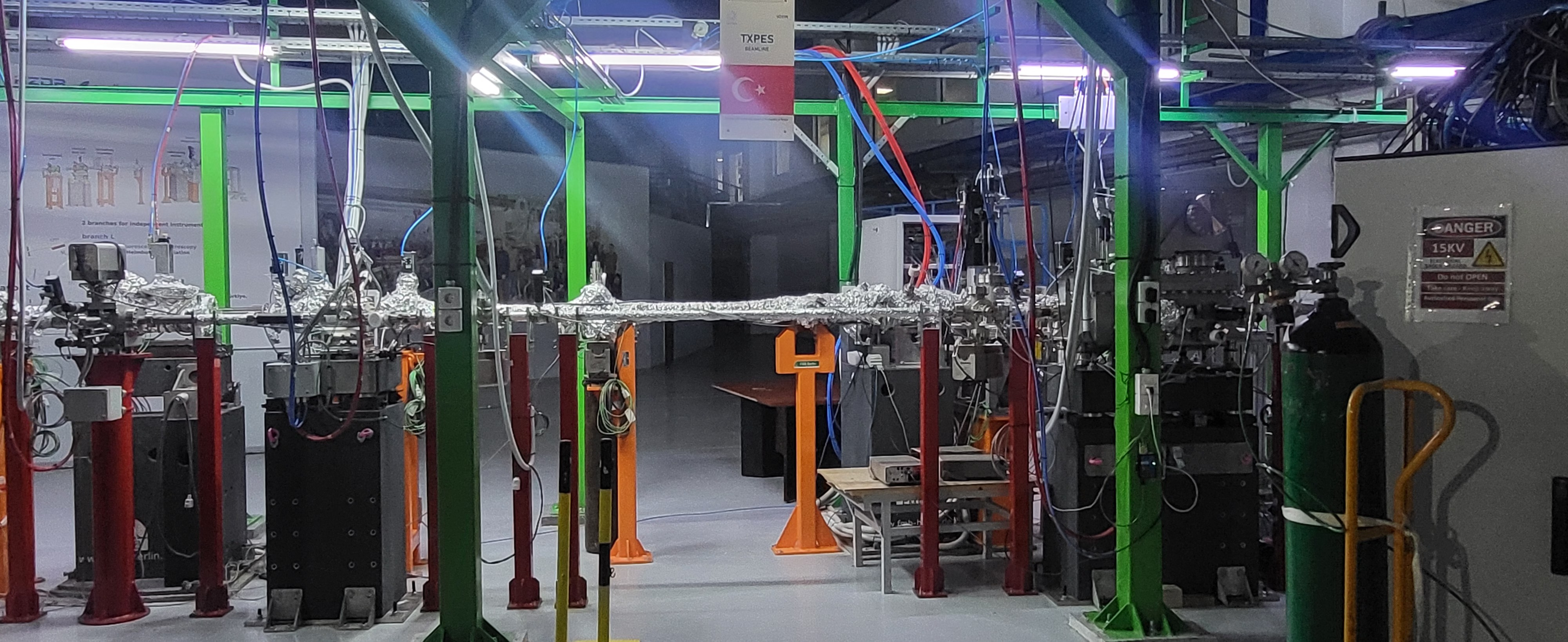
Turkish soft X-ray PhotoElectron Spectroscopy beamline at SESAME. The HESEB beamline, mounted on the orange legs, is right behind it.

- IR (Infrared) spectromicroscopy beamline: hosting users since November 2018
- XAFS/XRF (X-ray Absorption Fine Structure/X-ray Fluorescence) spectroscopy beamline: hosting users since July 2018
- MS/XPD (Materials Science/X-ray Powder Diffraction) beamline: hosting users since December 2020
- BEATS (BEAmline for Tomography at SESAME): hosting users since February 2024.
- HESEB (HElmholtz-SEsame Beamline): hosting users since February 2024.
- TXPES (Turkish soft X-ray PhotoElectron Spectroscopy) beamline: funded by TENMAK (Turkish Energy, Nuclear and Mineral Research Agency) and built by a consortium including TARLA (Turkish Accelerator and Radiation Laboratory), it is the first beamline at SESAME to have been designed, constructed and installed by the national community of one of SESAME's members; inaugurated in December 2025.
- MX (Macromolecular Crystallography) beamline: in design stage
- SAXS/WAXS (Small Angle and Wide Angle X-ray Scattering) beamline: planned

== Initial beams ==
Although the current facility has space for seven light beams, only two beams were operational when the facility opened in 2017. The first beam is an X-ray beam that will be used to study pollution in the Jordan Valley, among other things. While the second beam provides infrared radiation for a microscope that would study biological tissue, including cancer cells. The rest are planned for later, with the third beam, an X-ray source used for crystallography, slated for late 2017.

== Deaths and delays ==
Dr. Masoud Alimohammadi and Dr. Magid Shahriari, two Iranian members of SESAME, were killed in two different attacks, for which an Iranian prosecutor accuses the Israeli Mossad in 2010. The roof of the laboratory collapsed during the 2013 Middle East cold snap due to heavy snowfall, which led to delays.

== See also ==
- Jordan Research and Training Reactor
- Science and technology in Jordan
- The African Light Source (AfLS)
