= BESSY =

Research establishment in Adlershof, Berlin, Germany

Coordinates: 52°25′40″N 13°31′57″E

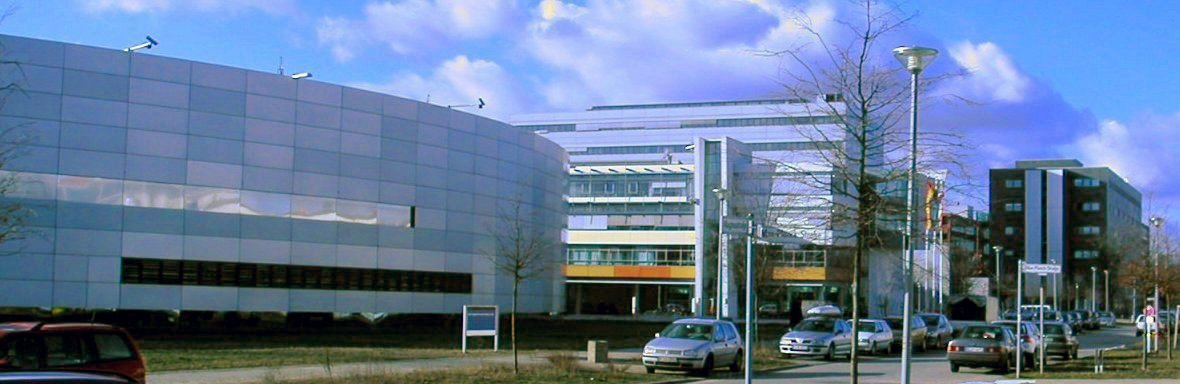
BESSY II storage ring and research building.

The Berliner Elektronenspeicherring-Gesellschaft für Synchrotronstrahlung m. b. H. (English: Berlin Electron Storage Ring Society for Synchrotron Radiation), abbreviated BESSY, is a research establishment in the Adlershof district of Berlin. Founded on 5 March 1979 (in then West-Berlin), it currently operates one of Germany's 3rd generation synchrotron radiation facilities, BESSY II. Originally part of the Leibniz Association, BESSY now belongs to the Helmholtz-Zentrum Berlin (since 1 January 2009).

Owing to the radiometry lab of the PTB , BESSY is the European calibration standard for electromagnetic radiation.

BESSY supplies synchrotron light and provides support for science and industry. There are institutional long-time users, like the Max-Planck-Society, the German Federal Institute for Materials Research and Testing (BAM) and the national metrology institute of Germany (the PTB). Furthermore, research groups from other institutes or universities can apply for utilization (so called beam time) for certain projects.

== BESSY I ==
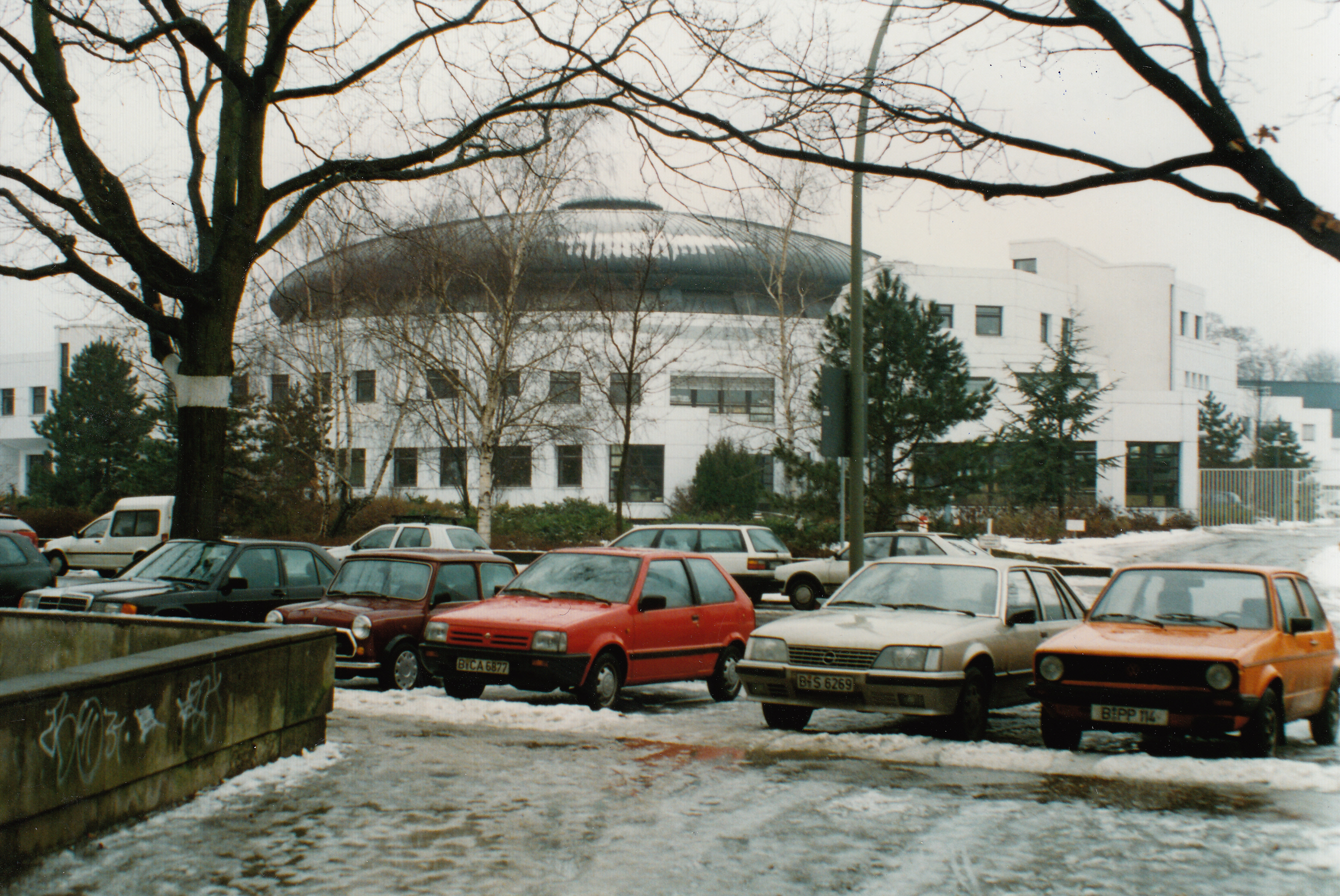
The BESSY I building seen in 1996.

This original synchrotron facility, costing the equivalent of 66.5 million Euro, became operational on 19 December 1981. It was situated in Wilmersdorf, then a borough of Berlin. The storage ring had a circumference of approx. 60 m. The circulating electrons that provided the radiation were in the energy range of 200 to 800 MeV (Vacuum Ultraviolet through Extreme Ultraviolet).

After its decommissioning in 1999, the component parts of the BESSY I machine were donated to the SESAME project by the German Authorities and have consequently been shipped to Jordan.

Famous achievements of BESSY I were the calibration of the spectrometers for the solar observatory probe SOHO as well as for the detectors for the Chandra X-ray Observatory.

== BESSY II ==
Groundbreaking for the new improved BESSY II synchrotron source in Adlershof took place on 4 July 1994, and the facility was inaugurated on 4 September 1998. The project cost was an equivalent of approximately 100 million Euros. The successor of BESSY I has a circumference of 240 m, providing 46 beam lines, and offers a multi-faceted mixture of experimental opportunities (undulator, wiggler and dipole sources) with excellent energy resolution. The combination of brightness and time resolution enables both femtosecond time and nanometer spatial resolutions.

Electrons can be accelerated to an energy of up to 1.7 GeV (X-ray regime), and are subsequently injected into the storage ring. Synchrotron radiation emerges from the dipole magnets that bend the beam on a circular path, as well as from undulators and wigglers. The total power input during regular operation is 2.7 MW.

BESSY II can be run in different modes, according to the time-distance between the electron wave packets that circulate in the storage ring:

- multi bunch: This is the most common mode. Around 350 equal packets are in the ring, with a pulse period of 2 ns
- single bunch: This mode is in effect for two weeks each half-year. Only one single electron packet is in the ring, thus enabling the users to measure with the highest possible time resolution. Two light pulses arrive with a gap of 800 ns and can therefore be easily separated.
- low alpha: This mode exists in single and multi bunch sub-modes. The spatial resolution of the electron packet is higher (it is compressed), which leads to a higher rate of Terahertz radiation and shorter light pulses.

Experiments at BESSY II are in the fields of X-ray absorption spectroscopy, Photoemission spectroscopy, Photoemission electron microscopy, X-ray microscopy, Infrared spectroscopy, femtosecond slicing, X-ray lithography, and protein structure analysis.

BESSY maintains a close co-operation with other synchrotron sources in the world, most notably with DESY in Hamburg.

Operation of BESSY II was interrupted on 15 June 2023 because of a cyberattack. The emission of light was restored at the beginning of July, but initially only for Physikalisch Technische Bundesanstalt.

== BESSY III ==
BESSY III is the planned 4th-generation successor to the BESSY II light source in Berlin-Adlershof. Conceptualized as a "Materials Discovery Facility," it is designed to be a transformative tool for research into the energy transition, quantum materials, and climate-neutral technologies. By specializing in the soft and "tender" X-ray range, BESSY III will offer spectral brilliance and coherence orders of magnitude higher than its predecessor, enabling the observation of chemical and physical processes with unprecedented precision.

The facility utilizes a modern Multi-Bend Achromat (MBA) lattice design and is being developed with a focus on sustainability, integrating energy-efficient operation and AI-driven automation from the start. This project is a collaborative effort with national metrology partners to maintain world-leading standards in material characterization and high-precision measurement.

== Other facilities ==
- In September 2008, the Metrology Light Source (MLS) was inaugurated. This facility in close proximity to BESSY II is run by PTB and provides synchrotron radiation in the energy range of far infrared and Terahertz radiation. The two facilities complement one another.
- In 2000, the construction of a free electron laser on the BESSY site was planned, which was dubbed BESSY-FEL. It was supposed to create extremely short and bright ultraviolet and X-ray pulses. In the autumn of 2008, the project was cut, and only an extension to the FLASH free electron laser in Hamburg is now to be built.
