= Shaaban Khalil =

Egyptian physicist

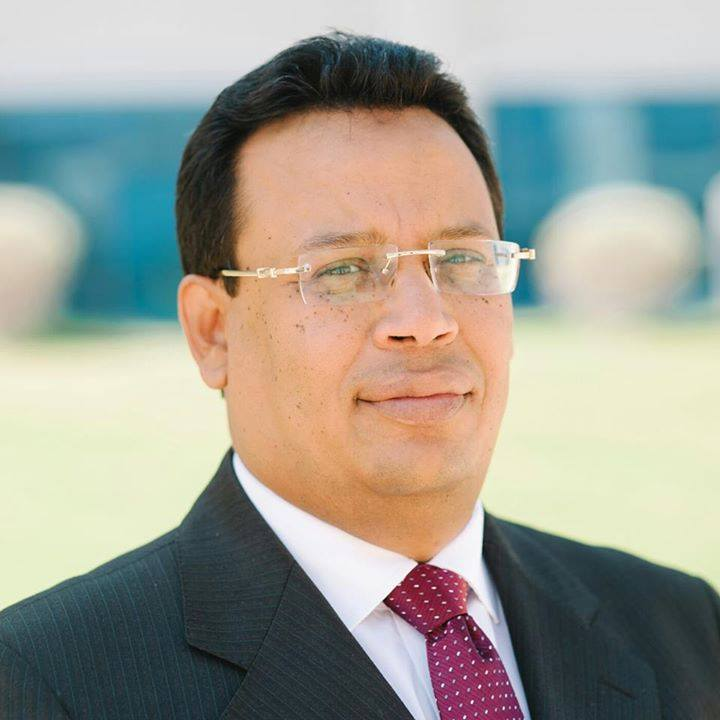
Dr. Khalil at Zewail City

Shaaban (Said) Khalil (born November 13, 1966) is a high energy physicist. He is the founding director of the Center for Fundamental Physics at Zewail City of Science and Technology in Egypt.

== Education and career ==
Khalil received his PhD in Supersymmetry Phenomenology under the supervision of Antonio Masiero (University of Padua) in 1997. He has awarded the Fulbright fellowship at the Bartol Research Institute at the University of Delaware, from 1999 to 2004 he held positions as a research and postdoctoral fellow at the Physics Department in Madrid University, Sussex University and the Institute of Particle Physics Phenomenology at Durham University. His work enabled him to obtain the DSc degree in 2006 from Ain Shams University, refereed by the Royal Society in the UK. He received the Leverhulme visiting professorship at the Physics Department at the University of Southampton in 2012–2013; he has been a visiting professor there since then.

Kalil was the founding director of the Center for Theoretical Physics at the British University in Egypt from 2006 to 2012. In 2012, he moved to help found and serve as director of the Center for Fundamental Physics at Zewail City of Science and Technology in Egypt. Khalil was also the Director-General of Research at Zewail City of Science and Technology from 2015 to 2018.

== Work ==
Khalil is the co-author of the book Supersymmetry and Standard Model Phenomenology, CRC Press, ISBN 9781138336438, published 2022 and Supersymmetry beyond Minimality: From Theory to Experiment, CRC Press, ISBN 9781498756730, published 2017. In addition, Khalil has published the Arabic book "A Journey into the Depths of Matter", Andromeda Publisher in UK, ISBN 978-1-7398152-9-5, published 2022. He has published more than 200 papers in scientific journals.

Khalil is the Egypt link person in the CMS experiment at the LHC and was the founding team leader of the Egyptian Network of High Energy Physics (ENHEP) at the CMS experiment from 2009 to 2012. In 2017, Khalil became the founding Editor-in-Chief of Letters in High Energy Physics (LHEP) journal published by Andromeda Publishing and Academic Services. He is also a reviewer for many international physics Journals. In 2020, Khalil was appointed as a member of the International Advisory Board of the Indian Journal of Physics(IJP) for five years. In 2020, Khalil has also been nominated as a member at the International Astronomical Union (IAU).

Khalil is the president of the Arab Physical Society (ArPS), chair of the African Academy of Sciences Membership Advisory Committee in the field of Physical Sciences, chair of "Africa Synchrotron Initiative" Committee, a member of the Research Council for Basic Sciences at the Academy of Scientific Research and Technology, and a member of the Executive Board of the Egyptian Network of Nuclear Sciences.

== Awards and honors ==
Khalil's research has received awards, such as the State Appreciation Award in Basic Sciences for the year 2021, Academy of Scientific Research and Technology, Shoman Award for Arab Physicists in 2001, the International Award of Istanbul University in Science in 2004, and local awards such as Egypt Award for Excellence in Basic Science in 2006, and Misr El-Kheir Award for Most Cited Researchers in 2010. He organized and attended many international conferences; he is a member of the Advisory Committee of the DSU. In 2016, Khalil was invited to give a plenary talk on Probing Supersymmetry/BSM through Flavor Physics at the 38th International Conference on High Energy Physics (ICHEP2016), on August 3–10, 2016, in Chicago, U.S.
