= Jordan Research and Training Reactor =

- Location within Jordan
- Operating institution: Jordan Atomic Energy Commission
- Location: Ar Ramtha, Jordan
- Coordinates: 32°27′46.2″N 35°58′22.2″E
- Power: 5 MW

Construction and upkeep
- Construction cost: $161 million
- Construction began: 1 August 2010; 15 years ago
- Time to construct: 62 months
- First criticality: 25 April 2016; 10 years ago
- Staff: 80

The Jordan Research and Training Reactor (JRTR) is a 5MW_{th} multipurpose research reactor located on the campus of Jordan University of Science and Technology in Ar Ramtha city in northern Jordan. The reactor was inaugurated under the patronage of King Abdullah II on 7 December 2016. The reactor is the first nuclear facility that was exported by South Korean consortium of Korea Atomic Energy Research Institute and Daewoo E&C, and is Jordan's first nuclear reactor.

== Description ==
The reactor will become the focal point for a Nuclear Science and Technology Center in the university which intends to serve Jordan by educating the upcoming generations of nuclear engineers and scientists in the country. The reactor and associated systems will be designed, constructed and operated to support; education and training in support of programs in nuclear engineering and nuclear reactor operations, forensic analysis, radioisotope production for medical and industrial applications, neutron beam applications including non-destructive examination and neutron science applications.

The research reactor was praised by a Korean nuclear safety official concerning the role of the Energy and Minerals Regulatory Commission in monitoring the reactor.

== See also ==
- Nuclear energy in Jordan
- Jordan Radioactive Storage Facility
- Synchrotron-Light for Experimental Science and Applications in the Middle East
