= Jordan Nuclear Regulatory Commission =

Hashemite Kingdom of Jordan Jordan Nuclear Regulatory Commission
- هيئة تنظيم العمل الإشعاعي والنووي

Agency overview
- Formed: July 1, 2007; 19 years ago
- Preceding agency: Nuclear Energy Commission
- Jurisdiction: Jordanian government
- Headquarters: Amman (Jordan)
- Agency executive: Dr. Jamal Sharaf, Chairman
- Website: http://www.jnrc.gov.jo

The Jordan Nuclear Regulatory Commission (JNRC) (Arabic هيئة تنظيم العمل الإشعاعي والنووي) was established in 2007 as a successor to the former Jordan Nuclear Energy Commission, established in 2001. The JNRC utilizes the IAEA safety standards and works closely with the IAEA in addition to the EU, USDOE, CNSC, IRSN and KINS.

In its capacity as a monitoring body that offers licenses to nuclear facilities, the commission is currently examining documents on the initial safety report presented by Jordan Atomic Energy Commission as well as working with the Korean Atomic Energy Research Institute to obtain permission for constructing a nuclear research plant on campus of Jordan University of Science and Technology with a capacity of 5-10 Mwatt.

== See also ==
- Jordan Radioactive Storage Facility
