= Helmholtz-Zentrum Berlin =

German scientific organization

Coordinates: 52°24′36″N 13°07′46″E

Helmholtz-Zentrum Berlin für Materialien und Energie
- Helmholtz-Zentrum Berlin für Materialien und Energie Logo
- Location(s): Berlin-Wannsee and Berlin-Adlershof
- Board of directors: Bernd Rech (scientific manager), Thomas Frederking (administrative manager)
- Website: www.helmholtz-berlin.de

Helmholtz-Zentrum Berlin für Materialien und Energie (Helmholtz Centre for Materials and Energy, HZB) is part of the Helmholtz Association of German Research Centres. The institute studies the structure and dynamics of materials and investigates solar cell technology. It also runs the third-generation BESSY II synchrotron in Adlershof. Until the end of 2019 it ran the 10 megawatt BER II nuclear research reactor at the Lise Meitner campus in Wannsee.

== History ==
Following the renaming of Hahn-Meitner-Institut Berlin GmbH to Helmholtz-Zentrum Berlin für Materialien und Energie GmbH on 5 June 2008, the legal merger of Berliner Elektronenspeicherring-Gesellschaft für Synchrotronstrahlung (BESSY) with HZB became visible on 1 January 2009.

The Hahn-Meitner-Institut Berlin für Kernforschung (HMI), named after Otto Hahn and Lise Meitner, was named 14 March 1959 in Berlin-Wannsee to operate the BER I research reactor that began operation with 50 kW on 24 July 1958, then named Institut für Kernforschung (IKB). The IKB was founded by the senate of Berlin (West) in winter 1956/57 as a dependent authority. Research originally focused on radiochemistry. In 1971, the federal government took over 90% of the shares in the HMI by converting it into a GmbH (limited liability company).

The Berliner Elektronenspeicherring-Gesellschaft für Synchrotronstrahlung GmbH (BESSY) was founded in 1979. The first synchrotron BESSY I in Berlin-Wilmersdorf began operations in 1982.

In May 2022, South African President Cyril Ramaphosa and German Chancellor Olaf Scholz, who was in South Africa on the final leg of a trip to Africa, publicly announced that HZB and Sasol had agreed to conduct research into catalysts (CARE-O-SENE project) to help produce sustainable aviation fuel on a commercial scale.
