= Jordan Atomic Energy Commission =

Hashemite Kingdom of Jordan Jordan Atomic Energy Commission
- هيئة الطاقة الذرية الأردنية
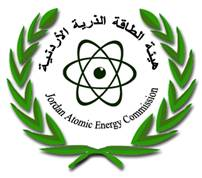

Agency overview
- Formed: January 5, 2008; 18 years ago
- Preceding agency: Nuclear Energy Commission
- Jurisdiction: Jordanian government
- Headquarters: Amman (Jordan)
- Agency executive: Dr. Khaled Toukan, Chairman
- Website: http://www.jaec.gov.jo

Jordan Atomic Energy Commission (JAEC) (Arabic هيئة الطاقة الذرية الأردنية) was established in place of the Jordan Nuclear Energy Commission. The main objective of the JAEC is to promote and develop peaceful utilization of atomic energy.

== Objectives ==
The commission directs its projects to the two objectives:

- The use of nuclear energy to produce electricity: Jordan is among the highest in the world in dependency on foreign energy sources, 96% of the country's energy needs come from imported oil and natural gas from neighboring Arab countries. This complete reliance on foreign oil imports consumes a significant amount of Jordan's GDP. This led the country to plan investments of $15 billion in renewable and nuclear energy. Jordan plans to get 60% of its energy needs from nuclear energy by 2035.
- Convert Salt water into drinking water: the scarcity of water resources in Jordan is one of the main challenges for Jordan. Although Jordan is considered among the top advanced countries in the world in water recycling, lack of water resources for a growing population is a main problem for the country, and it is given a high priority by the Jordanian governments. A study by the Ministry of Natural Resources found that the only way to meet the increasing water demands in the country is through desalination of sea water from the Gulf of Aqaba, then pumping the water to altitudes of 800–1000 meters above sea level to the population centers in Amman, Irbid, and Zarqa traveling distances of 300–400 km.

== Jordanian Nuclear Program ==
The nuclear program of Jordan includes building a research nuclear plant on campus of Jordan University of Science and Technology with a capacity of 5-10 Mwatt, for scientific research in medical, agricultural, and health services, the reactor was scheduled to be built in 2013.

Jordan signed or is in the process of signing bilateral treaties with the United States, France, South Korea, China, Japan, Canada, Russia, Ukraine, Romania, Spain, Argentina and the United Kingdom.

The program also includes building a nuclear reactor on the Gulf of Aqaba 2–3 years after building the first one, with the purpose of desalinating water, followed by four nuclear electric power plants by the year 2035.

In October 2013 the Russian VVER-1000 design was selected in a competitive tender for Jordan's first twin reactor nuclear power station.

The Jordan Nuclear Regulatory Commission (JNRC) was established in 2007 to regulate and monitor the use of nuclear energy and ionizing radiation.

== Synchrotron-light for Experimental Science and Applications in the Middle East (SESAME) ==
JAEC collaborates with UNESCO in constructing the Middle East's first major international research center: International Centre for Synchrotron-Light for Experimental Science Applications in the Middle East (SESAME) in Allaan, Jordan (30 km from Amman). The project is provisioned and under the full responsibility of a council of six permanent members: Bahrain, Egypt, Israel, Jordan, Pakistan, Palestinian Authority, and Turkey. Observer countries are Germany, Greece, Italy, Kuwait, Russian Federation, Sweden, UK, and the US.

== See also ==
- Jordan University of Science and Technology
- Jordan Research and Training Reactor
- Jordan Radioactive Storage Facility
- Jordan Nuclear Regulatory Commission
