= Khaled Toukan =

Jordanian politician (born 1954)

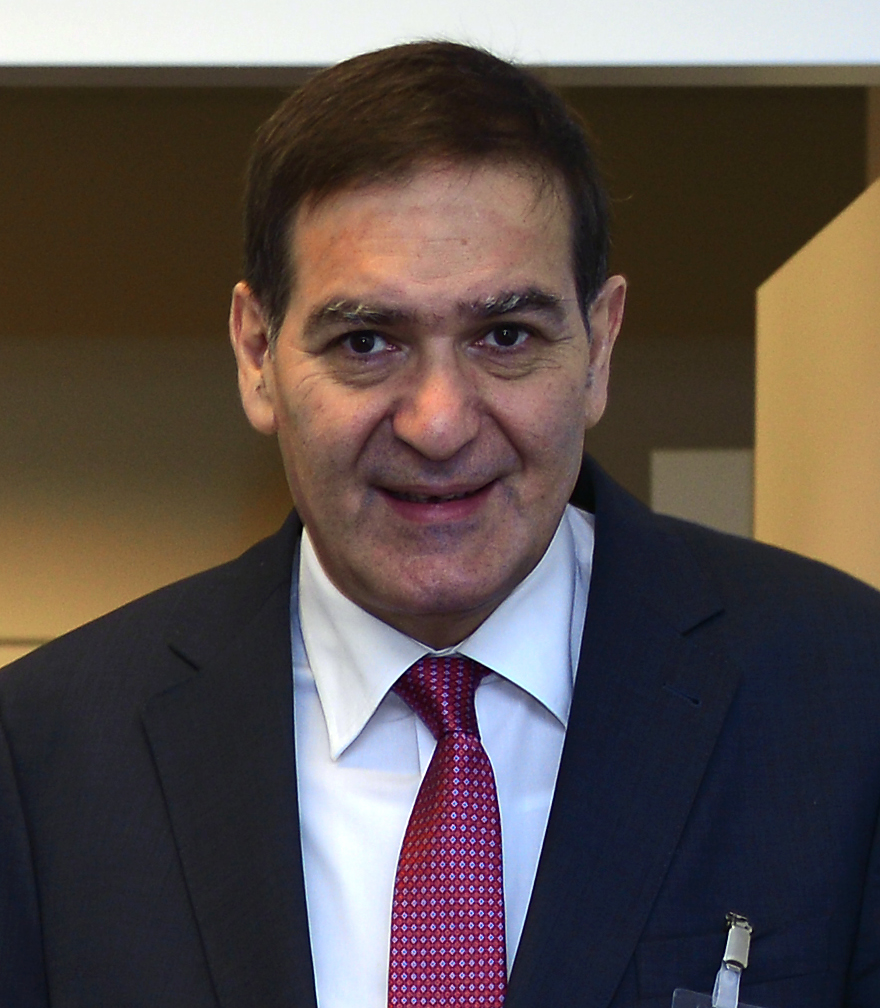
- Born: Khaled Awni Abdulrahman Toukan; 1954 (age 71–72); Amman, Jordan
- Education: M.I.T
- Occupation: Jordan Atomic Energy Commission (Chairman)

Khaled Awni Abdulrahman Toukan (Arabic: خالد عوني عبد الرحمن طوقان; born 1954) is the current chairman of the Jordan Atomic Energy Commission, and the Director General of the Synchrotron-light for Experimental Science and Applications in the Middle East (SESAME). He is also serving on the Standing Advisory Group for Nuclear Energy to the Director General of the International Atomic Energy Agency. Previously, Dr Toukan served as the Minister of Energy for the Hashemite Kingdom of Jordan (2011), Minister of Education (2000-2008), and as Minister of Higher Education and Scientific Research (2001–2002).

== Early and personal life ==
Born in Amman in 1954, Toukan is married with 3 children. He holds a Ph.D. in Nuclear Engineering from the Massachusetts Institute of Technology (1978–1982), an M.Sc. degree in Nuclear Engineering from University of Michigan (1976–1978), and a B.E. degree in Electrical Engineering from American University of Beirut (1971–1976).

== Academic career ==
Toukan was the president of Al-Balqa` Applied University from (1997–2001). He also held the position of acting dean of Faculty of Engineering & Technology and professor of industrial engineering at the University of Jordan, currently he is a member of the university's board of trustees, research scientist at Karlsruhe Institute of Technology, and associate research scientist at the King Fahd University of Petroleum and Minerals, Saudi Arabia.

Toukan is a member of the International High-Level EFA Group, a member of H.M. King Abdullah II Economic Consultative Council, acting director of SESAME, and the Jordan representative to SESAME Council and Vice –Chairman.

== Ministerial roles ==
×	Term start	Term end	Office	Head of Government
1	9 February 2011	17 November 2011	Minister of Energy and Mineral Resources	Marouf al-Bakhit
2	27 November 2005	22 November 2007	Minister of Education, Higher Education and Scientific Research	Marouf al-Bakhit
3	7 April 2005	24 November 2005	Minister of Education, Higher Education and Scientific Research	Adnan Badran
4	25 October 2003	5 April 2005	Minister of Education	Faisal al-Fayez
5	21 July 2003	22 October 2003	Minister of Education	Ali Abu al-Ragheb
6	14 January 2002	20 July 2003	Minister of Education	Ali Abu al-Ragheb
7	2 September 2001	14 January 2002	Minister of Education, Higher Education and Scientific Research	Ali Abu al-Ragheb
8	19 June 2000	1 September 2001	Minister of Education	Ali Abu al-Ragheb

== Awards ==
Toukan's awards include the King Hussein Medal for Distinguished Giving (First Class) from His Majesty King Abdullah II, the Gandhi Medal for Peace from the Director General of UNESCO (2003), The French Legion of Honour (Commander Rank) from the (then) President of the French Republic, Mr. Jacques Chirac, the German Medal of Honour (Commander Rank) from the (then) President of the Federal Republic of Germany, Mr. Horst Köhler, the Royal Grand Gordon of Alkukab Al-Urduni (2003), and the Theos, J. Thompson Fellowship (1980–81) from the Department of Nuclear Engineering at M.I.T.
