= Sarah Wild =

South African science journalist and author

Sarah Wild is a British-South African science journalist and author. In November 2017 she became the first African to win a AAAS Kavli Science Journalism Award.

Wild is the author of Searching African Skies: The Square Kilometre Array and South Africa’s Quest to Hear the Songs of the Stars (2012) and Innovation: Shaping South Africa through Science (2015), which was published in Afrikaans as Innovasie: Hoe wetenskap Suid-Afrika vorm. In 2023 she published Human Origins: A Short History, which was published in Chinese in 2024.

Wild was named the Siemens pan-African Profile Awards for science journalism winner in 2013, and received the Dow Technology and Innovation Reporting award at the 2015 CNN Multichjoice African Journalist of the Year awards.

Wild has written for Nature, Science, Scientific American, The Guardian, The Observer, The Atlantic, The Economist, Undark Magazine, Quartz, AfricaCheck, Mail & Guardian, and Business Day.
