= European Synchrotron Radiation Facility =

Synchrotron light source in France

European Synchrotron Radiation Facility Installation européenne de rayonnement synchrotron
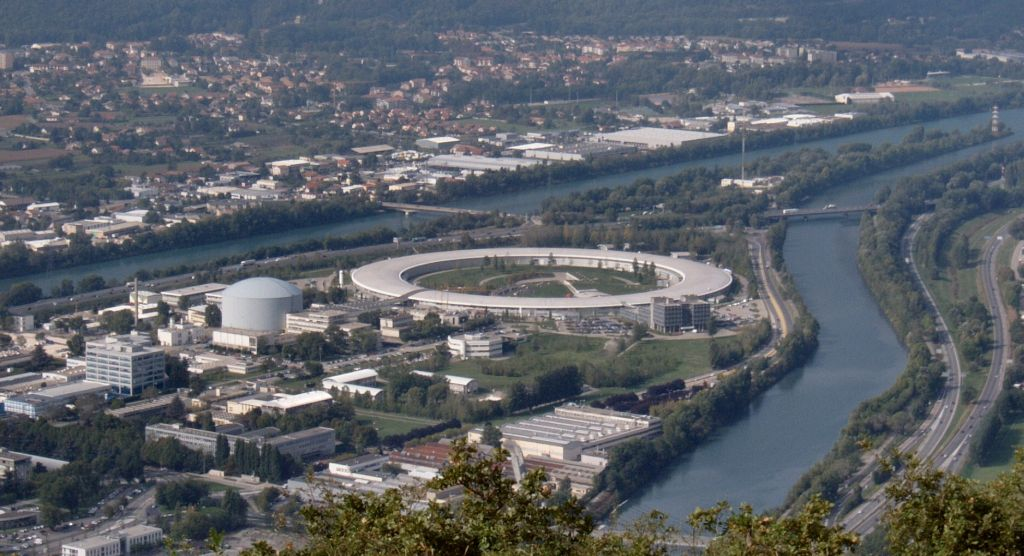
- ESRF site

- Member states Scientific associates
- Formation: September 30, 1994; 32 years ago
- Headquarters: Grenoble, France
- Members: 19 partner nations: 13 member states; France (27.5%); Germany (24%); Italy (13.2%); United Kingdom (10.5%); Russia (6%); Benesync (5.8%); Belgium; The Netherlands; Nordsync (5.0%); Denmark; Finland; Norway; Sweden; Spain (4%); Switzerland (4%); 6 scientific associates; Austria (1.75%); Israel (1.75%); Poland (1%); Portugal (1%); Czech Republic (0.6%); South Africa (0.3%)
- Official languages: English
- Leader: Jean Daillant
- Website: www.esrf.fr

ESRF-EBS
General properties
- Accelerator type: Synchrotron
- Beam type: Electron
- Target type: Light source

Beam properties
- Maximum energy: 6 GeV
- Maximum brightness: 3.56×10^{21} ph./s/0.1%/mm^{2}/mrad^{2}

Physical properties
- Circumference: 843.977 metres (2,768.95 ft)
- Location: Grenoble, France
- Coordinates: 45°12′31″N 5°41′24″E
- Institution: ESRF
- Dates of operation: 2020–present

The European Synchrotron (also European Synchrotron Radiation Facility, ESRF) is a synchrotron light source situated in Grenoble, France. It is a joint research facility supported by 19 countries (13 member countries: Belgium, Denmark, Finland, France, Germany, Italy, the Netherlands, Norway, Russia, Spain, Sweden, Switzerland, and the UK; and 6 associate countries: Austria, the Czech Republic, Israel, Poland, Portugal and South Africa).

Some 10,000 scientists visit this particle accelerator each year, conducting upwards of 2,000 experiments and producing around 1,800 scientific publications.

== History ==
Inaugurated in September 1994, it has an annual operating budget of around 100 million euros as of 2015, employs around 700 people and is host to more than 10,000 visiting scientists each year.

The ESRF was the world's first third generation synchrotron when it opened for user operation in 1994.

In 2009, the ESRF began a major refurbishment programme that, at term, has seen its performances increase 100-fold. In 2015, the facility built an 8000 m2 extension to the original experimental hall, a new data centre and introduced an ambitious detector development programme. The ESRF's X-rays are 100 billion times brighter than hospital X-rays produced for medical radiographies.

The second stage of the refurbishment programme included a new improved storage ring – the Extremely Brilliant Source (ESRF-EBS). Planning started in 2015 with works spanning the years 2018–2020. With EBS, the ESRF improved its X-ray intensity by a factor of 100, or 10,000 billion times more powerful than X-rays used in the medical field. ESRF-EBS became the first fourth-generation high-energy synchrotron in the world.

The first electron beam tests for ESRF-EBS began on November 28, 2019. The facility reopened to users on August 25, 2020.

== General description ==
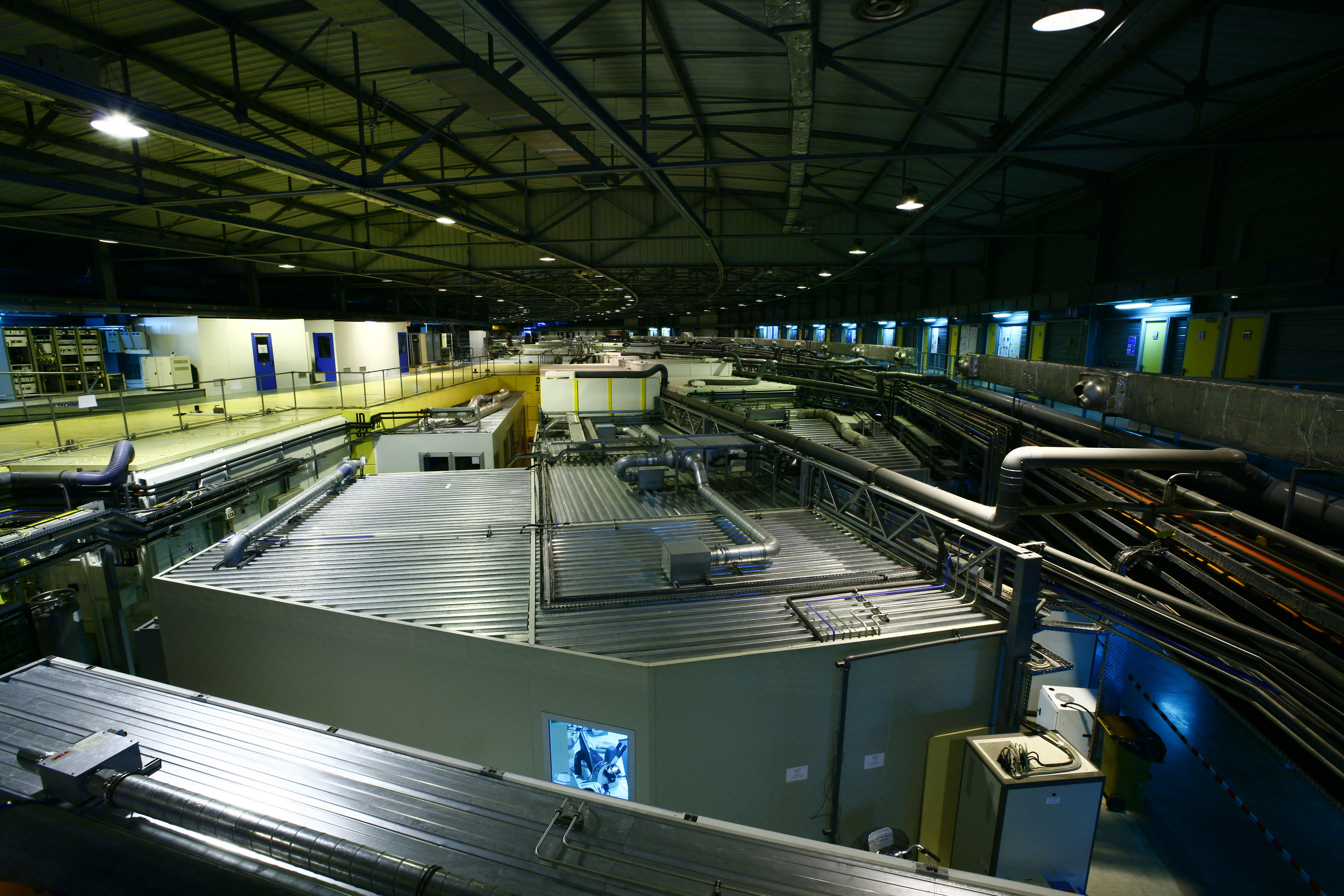
Top view of the ring

The ESRF physical plant consists of two main buildings: the experimental hall, containing the 844 metre circumference storage ring and 46 tangential beamlines; and a block of laboratories, preparation suites and offices. The linear accelerator electron gun and smaller booster ring used to bring the beam to an operating energy of 6 GeV are constructed within the main ring.

Research at the ESRF focuses, in large part, on the use of X-ray radiation in fields as diverse as protein crystallography, earth science, paleontology, materials science, chemistry and physics. Facilities such as the ESRF offer a flux, energy range and resolution unachievable with conventional (laboratory) radiation sources.

== Study results ==
In 2014, ancient books destroyed by the eruption of Mount Vesuvius in 79 AD were read for the first time in the ESRF. These 1840 fragments were reduced to the status of charred cylinders.

In 2015, scientists from the University of Sheffield used the ESRF's X-rays to study the blue and white feathers of the jay, and found that the birds use well-controlled changes to the nanostructure of their feathers to create the vivid colours of their plumage. This research opened new possibilities for creating non-fading, synthetic colours for paints and clothing.

In July 2016, a team of South African researchers scanned a complete fossilized skeleton of a small dinosaur discovered in 2005 in South Africa and more than 200 million years old. The dentition of heterodontosauridae, when scanned, revealed palate bones less than a millimeter thick.

On December 6, 2017, the journal Nature unveiled the discovery at the European synchrotron of a new species of dinosaur with surprising characteristics that lived about 72 million years ago. It is a biped, with some features of a velociraptor, an ostrich and a swan, with a crocodile-like muzzle and penguin-like wings. With a height of about 1.2 meters (4 ft) and with killer claws, it could hunt his prey on the ground or by swimming in the water, which is a novelty for scientists in the study of dinosaurs.

In November 2021, researchers demonstrated a novel X-ray imaging technique, "HiP-CT", for 3D cellular-resolution scans of whole organs, using the ESRF's "Extremely Brilliant Source". The published online Human Organ Atlas includes the lungs from a donor who died with COVID-19.

In October 2024, First Light Fusion, in collaboration with the University of Oxford's Department of Engineering Science, performed an experiment on inertial fusion on the ID19 beamline to investigate the formation and transit of shock waves through some of First Light Fusion’s amplifiers.

== Access ==
The ESRF site forms part of the "Polygone Scientifique", lying at the confluence of the rivers Drac and Isère about 1.5 km from the centre of Grenoble. It is served by Grenoble tramway system and local bus lines of Semitag (C6, 22 and 54). It is served by Grenoble–Isère Airport and Lyon–Saint-Exupéry Airport.

The ESRF shares its site with several other institutions including the Institut Laue-Langevin (ILL), the European Molecular Biology Laboratory (EMBL) and the Institut de biologie structurale. The Centre national de la recherche scientifique (CNRS) has an institute across the road.

== People ==
- Roderick MacKinnon, Nobel Prize in Chemistry 2003, has carried out experiments on beamline ID13.
- Venki Ramakrishnan, Thomas A. Steitz, and Ada Yonath, Nobel Prize in Chemistry 2009, have used macromolecular crystallography beamlines (ID14-1, -2, -4; and ID29) at the ESRF.
- Brian Kobilka and Robert Lefkowitz, Nobel Prize in Chemistry 2012, have carried out experiments mainly on beamline ID13.
- Sine Larsen (1943–2025), Danish chemist and crystallographer was a scientific research director and the first female director of the ESRF

== See also ==
- List of Synchrotron Radiation Facilities
- European Research Area (ERA)
- TANGO (control system originally developed at the ESRF)
- The African Light Source (AfLS)
