= Aster Gebrekirstos =

Ethiopian dendrochronologist

Aster Gebrekirstos FAAS FTWAS
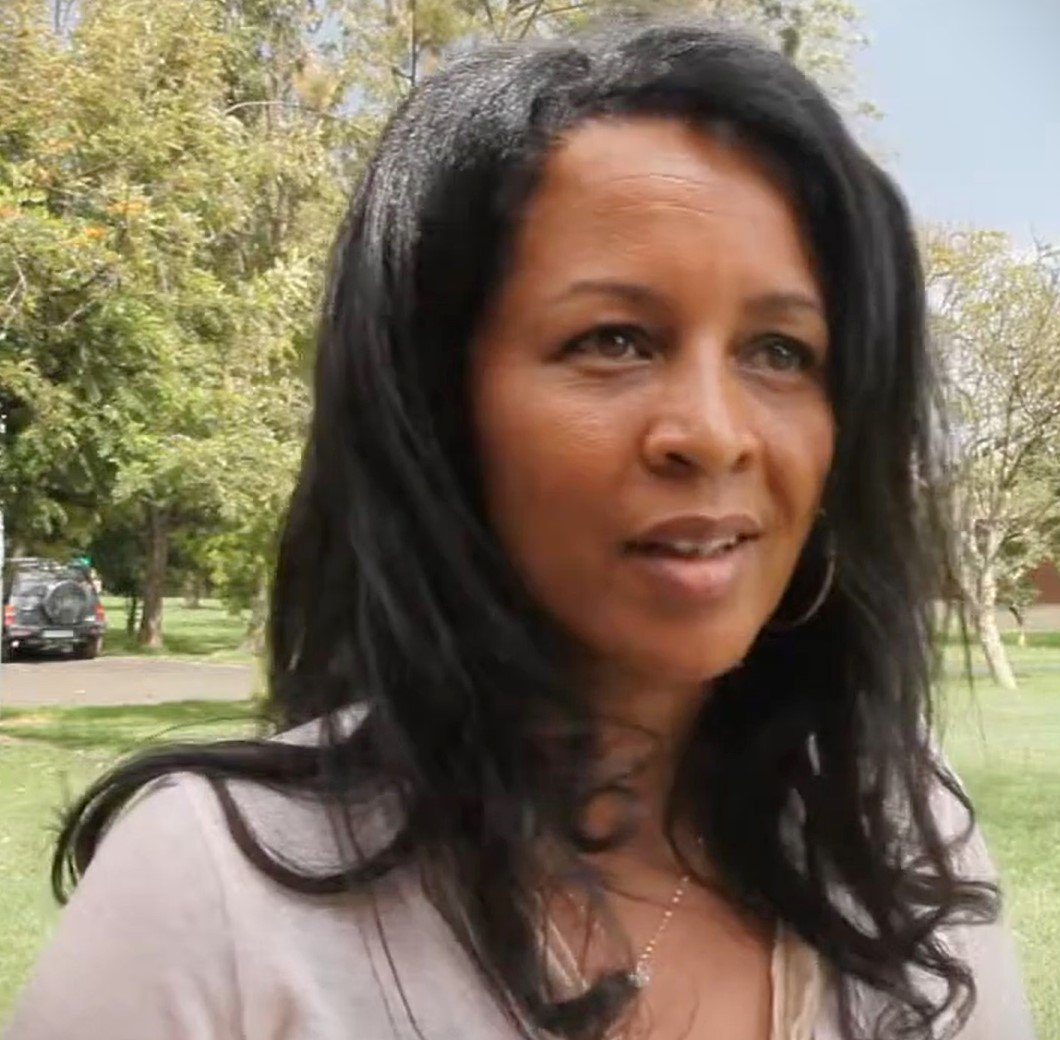
- Gebrekirstos in 2013
- Born: Aster Afwork Gebrekirstos; Shire, Tigray, Ethiopia
- Education: Hawassa University; Haramaya University; Wageningen University, Göttingen University
- Known for: Establishment of the Dendrochronology Laboratory, Ethiopia
- Awards: African Climate Award; Special Award for Ground Breaking Science
- Scientific career
- Fields: Agroforestry; Dendrochronology; Climate change
- Workplaces: World Agroforestry Centre; Dendrochronology Laboratory; Africa RISING

Aster Afwork Gebrekirstos is an Ethiopian scientist and a professor of agroforestry at World Agroforestry Centre (ICRAF).

== Early life and education ==
Aster Gebrekirstos was born in Shire, Tigray, Ethiopia, as the first child of a family of seven. She had the intention of becoming a doctor but her high-school results did not qualify her for the profession and she had to choose between teaching and forestry and she chose the latter.

She obtained a Bachelor of Science in Forestry from the Haramaya University. She stayed at the Haramaya University as a graduate assistant immediately after her bachelor's degree before winning the Netherland Fellowship and complete a Master of Science at Wageningen University & Research (1996–1998). She took a lectureship position at Wondo Genet College of Forestry, Hawassa University.

She was awarded German Academic Exchange Service (DAAD) scholarship to do a Doctor of Philosophy at Gottingen University in Germany (2001–2005). After her Ph.D., she joined as a postdoctoral researcher at the Department of Biophysics and Biochemistry, Umeå University, Sweden (2006–2008) before going to ICRAF, Kenya and Göttingen University, Germany (2009–2011).

== Career and research ==
As a dendrochronologist, she established dendrochronology laboratory in Ethiopia in 2009, the dendrochronology laboratory at Wondo Genet College of Forestry and Natural Resources in 2010, and the World Agroforestry Centre's dendrochronology laboratory in Kenya in 2013.

Her research focuses on Dendroisotopy, climate change, plant-water relations, and social forestry. Gebrekirstos is a visiting professor at the West African Science Service Center on Climate Change, Adapted Land Use (WASCAL) program, Dresden University of Applied Sciences, Centre for International Postgraduate Studies of Environmental Management (CIPSEM). She is serving as the Chair of the Environment Committee African Academy of Sciences and Deputy coordinator of IUFRO Task Force on Global Tree Mortality Patterns and Trends, Mountain Research Institute Science Leadership Council.

== Awards and recognition ==
She was elected a Fellow of the African Academy of Sciences in 2017.

Fellow of the World Academy of Sciences in 2021.

Fellow of the International Academy of Wood Sciences in 2021.

In 2014, she was awarded the African Climate Award for Excellence Research in climate adaptation and mitigation. She is also the Winner of the 2019 Special Award for Ground Breaking Science; an African-wide Young Professionals and Women in Science Competitions that was organized by the Technical Centre for Agricultural and Rural Cooperation ACP-EU (CTA), African Technology Policy Studies (ATPS), Alliance for a Green Revolution in Africa (AGRA), Forum for Agricultural Research in Africa (FARA), Regional Universities Forum for Capacity Building in Agriculture (RUFORUM), and the New Partnership for Africa’s Development (NEPAD).

== Selected publications ==
- Aster Gebrekirstos, Ralph Mitlöhner, Demel Teketay, Martin Worbes (2008/10). Climate–growth relationships of the dominant tree species from semi-arid savanna woodland in Ethiopia. Trees 22:631-641
- Aster Gebrekirstos, Demel Teketay, Masresha Fetene, Ralph Mitlöhner (2006). Adaptation of five co-occurring tree and shrub species to water stress and its implication in restoration of degraded lands. Forest Ecology and Management 229:1-3 259–267
- Aster Gebrekirstos, Martin Worbes, Demel Teketay, Masresha Fetene, Ralph Mitlöhner (2009/4/1). Stable carbon isotope ratios in tree rings of co-occurring species from semi-arid tropics in Africa: patterns and climatic signals. Global and Planetary Change 66:3-4 253–260
- Abiyu A, Mokria M, Gebrekirstos A, Bräuning A. (2018). Tree-ring record in Ethiopian church forests reveals successive generation differences in growth rates and disturbance events. Forest Ecology and Management 409: 835–844.
- Mokria M, Gebrekirstos A, Abiyu A, Noordwijk M, Bräuning A. (2017). Multi-century tree-ring precipitation record reveals increasing frequency of extreme dry events in the upper Blue Nile River catchment. Global Change Biology 23: 12 5436–5454.
