= Jordan Radioactive Storage Facility =

Nuclear waste storage site

The Jordan Radioactive Storage Facility is a proposed national storage facility in Amman for Jordan's radioactive waste and nuclear materials.

The agreement between Jordan Atomic Energy Commission (JAEC) and the US Department of Energy's (DoE's) Pacific Northwest National Laboratory (PNNL) was signed by Ned Xoubi, nuclear fuel cycle commissioner at JAEC, and Daniel Rutherford, contract manager at PNNL.

The project was completed in 2017 and became operational in 2019. It consists of an approximately four thousand square foot storage facility that will hold Jordan's radioactive waste and nuclear sources in a safe and secure environment for the next five decades. All radioactive waste will be managed, stored and monitored in strict accordance with the best international standards and the International Atomic Energy Agency (IAEA) guidelines.

The facility is the first of its kind in Jordan and is being designed and constructed by Jordanian engineers with the help of American experts. JAEC will provide the project manager Ned Xoubi, and the DoE will provide JAEC with $370,000 for the construction of the central storage facility.
