= Beamline =

Trajectory of a beam of accelerated particles

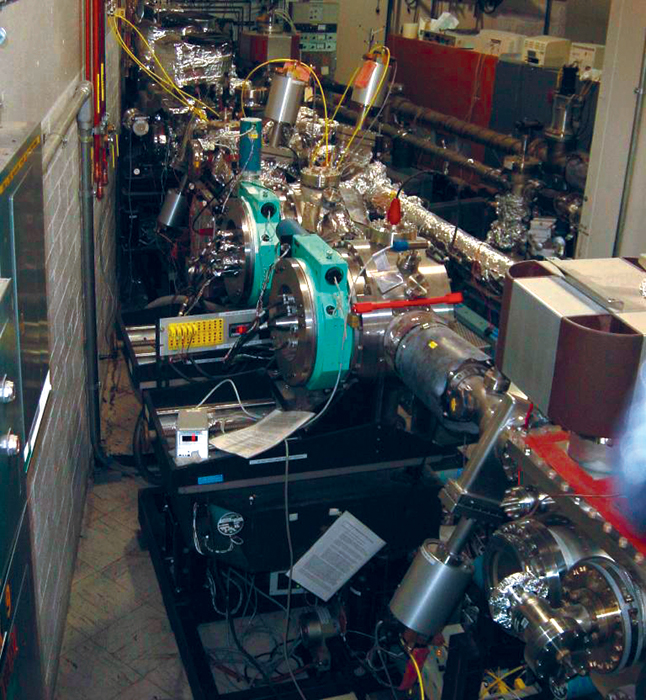
Beamline at Brookhaven National Laboratory.

In accelerator physics, a beamline refers to the trajectory of the beam of particles, including the overall construction of the path segment (guide tubes, diagnostic devices) along a specific path of an accelerator facility. This part is either

- the line in a linear accelerator along which a beam of particles travels, or
- the path leading from particle generator (e.g. a cyclic accelerator, synchrotron light sources, cyclotrons, or spallation sources) to the experimental end-station.

Beamlines usually end in experimental stations that utilize particle beams or synchrotron light obtained from a synchrotron, or neutrons from a spallation source or research reactor. Beamlines are used in experiments in particle physics, materials science, life science, chemistry, and molecular biology, but can also be used for irradiation tests or to produce isotopes.

== Beamline in a particle accelerator ==
In particle accelerators the beamline is usually housed in a tunnel and/or underground, cased inside a concrete housing for shielding purposes. The beamline is usually a cylindrical metal pipe, typically called a beam pipe, and/or a drift tube, evacuated to a high vacuum so there are few gas molecules in the path for the beam of accelerated particles to hit, which otherwise could scatter them before they reach their destination.

There are specialized devices and equipment on the beamline that are used for producing, maintaining, monitoring, and accelerating the particle beam. These devices may be in proximity of or attached directly to the beamline. These devices include sophisticated transducers, diagnostics (position monitors and wire scanners), lenses, collimators, thermocouples, ion pumps, ion gauges, ion chambers (for diagnostic purposes; usually called "beam monitors"), vacuum valves ("isolation valves"), and gate valves, to mention a few.

It is imperative to have all beamline sections, magnets, etc., aligned (often by a survey and an alignment crew by using a laser tracker), beamlines must be within micrometre tolerance. Good alignment helps to prevent beam loss, and beam from colliding with the pipe walls, which creates secondary emissions and/or radiation.

== Synchrotron radiation beamline ==
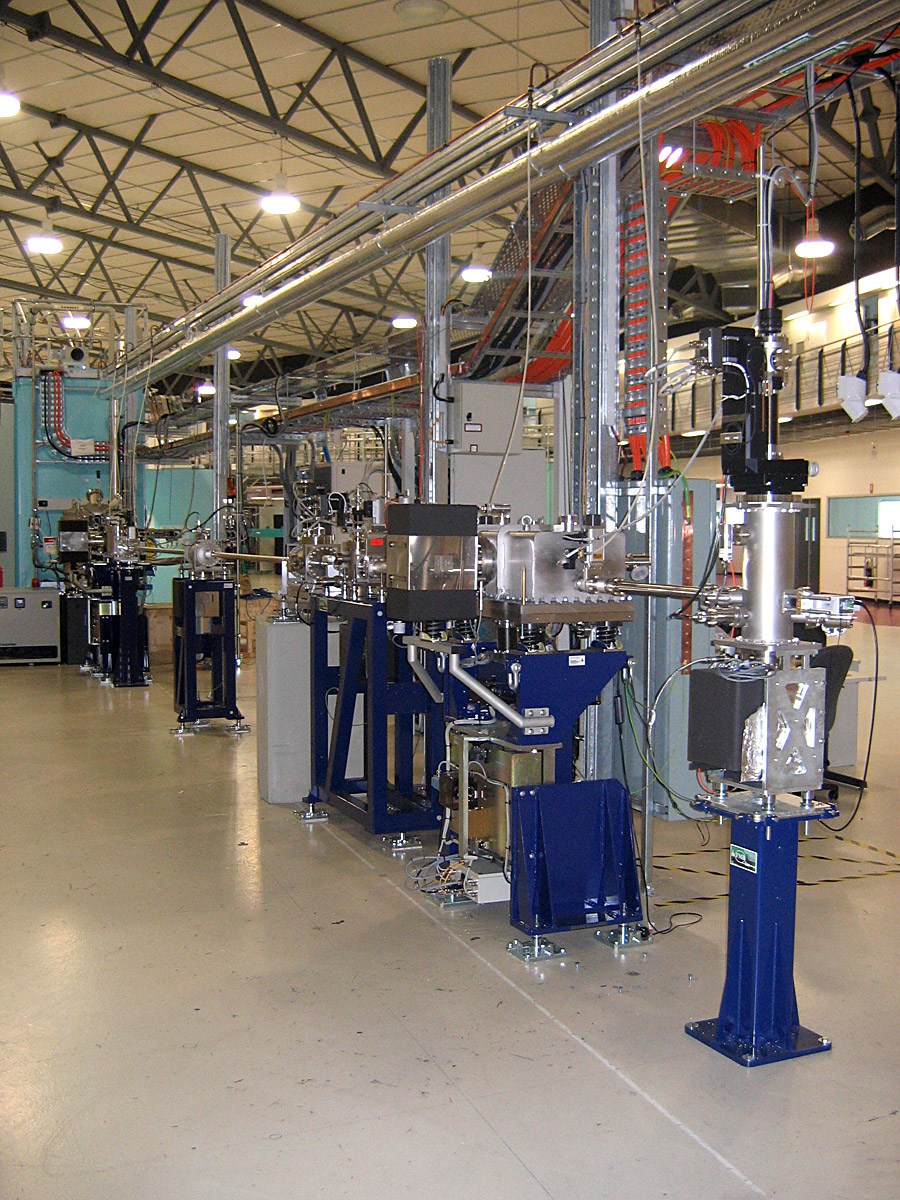
The exposed workings of a soft x-ray beamline and endstation at the Australian Synchrotron

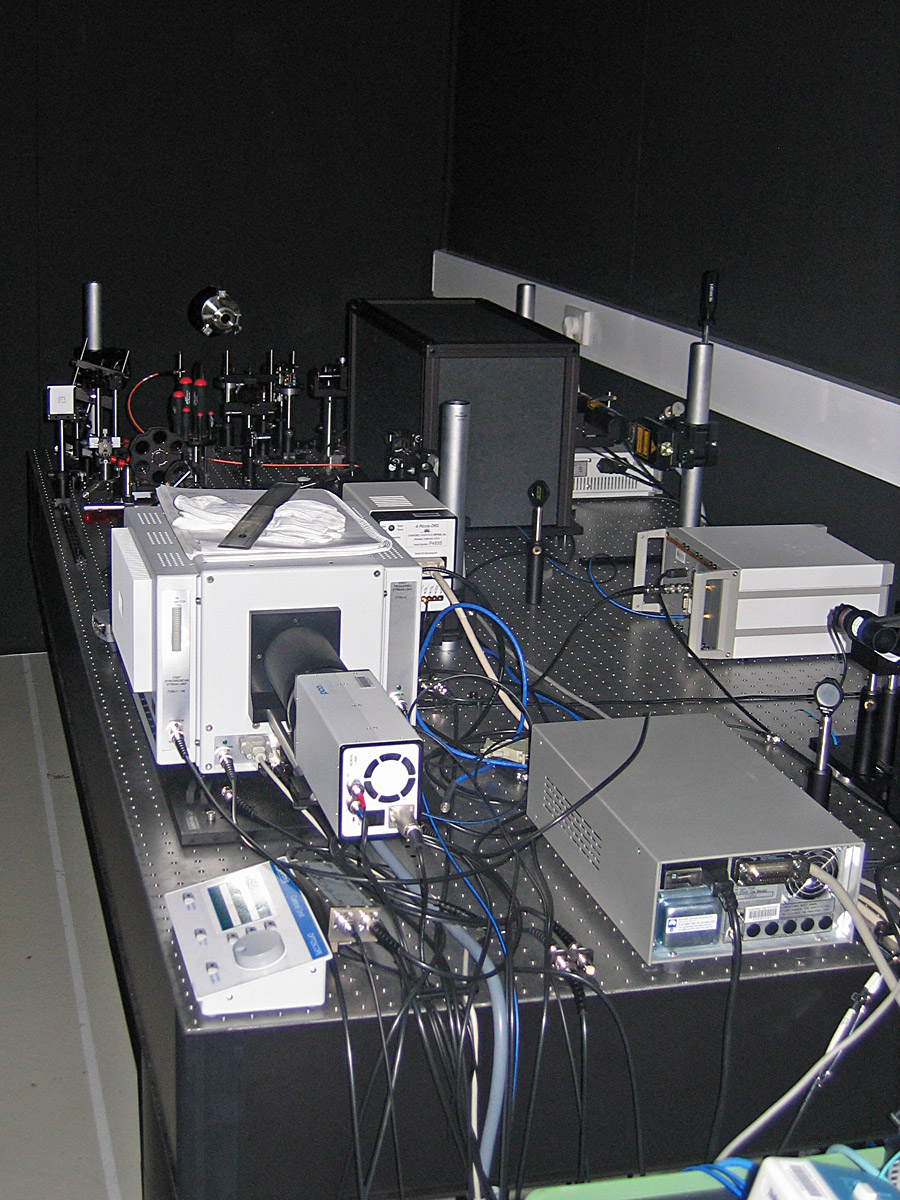
Inside the Optical Diagnostic Beamline (ODB) hutch at the Australian Synchrotron; the beamline terminates at the small aperture in the back wall

Regarding synchrotrons, beamline may also refer to the instrumentation that carries beams of synchrotron radiation to an experimental end station, which uses the radiation produced by the bending magnets and insertion devices in the storage ring of a synchrotron radiation facility. A typical application for this kind of beamline is crystallography, although many other techniques utilising synchrotron light exist.

At a large synchrotron facility there will be many beamlines, each optimised for a particular field of research. The differences will depend on the type of insertion device (which, in turn, determines the intensity and spectral distribution of the radiation); the beam conditioning equipment; and the experimental end station. A typical beamline at a modern synchrotron facility will be 25 to 100 m long from the storage ring to the end station, and may cost up to millions of US dollars. For this reason, a synchrotron facility is often built in stages, with the first few beamlines opening on day one of operation, and other beamlines being added later as the funding permits.

The beamline elements are located in radiation shielding enclosures, called hutches, which are the size of a small room (cabin). A typical beamline consists of two hutches, an optical hutch for the beam conditioning elements and an experimental hutch, which houses the experiment. Between hutches, the beam travels in a transport tube. Entrance to the hutches is forbidden when the beam shutter is open and radiation can enter the hutch. This is enforced by the use of elaborate safety systems with redundant interlocking functions, which make sure that no one is inside the hutch when the radiation is turned on. The safety system will also shut down the radiation beam if the door to the hutch is accidentally opened when the beam is on. In this case, the beam is dumped, meaning the stored beam is diverted into a target designed to absorb and contain its energy.

Elements that are used in beamlines by experimenters for conditioning the radiation beam between the storage ring and the end station include the following:

- Windows: windows are used to separate UHV and HV vacuum sections and to terminate the beamline. They are also used between UHV vacuum sections to provide protection from vacuum accidents. The foils used for the window membrane also attenuate the radiation spectrum in the region below 6KeV.

1- Beryllium Windows: Beryllium windows can be supplied cooled, or uncooled, with various sizes (and numbers) of window apertures. Windows are sized to suit specific requirements, however the maximum size of a window is determined by the foil thickness and pressure differential to be withstood. Windows can be supplied fitted with a range of beam entry/exit flange sizes to suite specific requirements. 2- CVD Diamond Windows: Chemical Vapour Deposition (CVD) Diamond offer extreme hardness, high thermal conductivity, chemical inertness, and high transparency over a very wide spectral range. Stronger and stiffer than Beryllium, with lower thermal expansion and lower toxicity, it is ideal for UHV isolation windows in X-ray beamlines. Windows can be supplied embedded in UHV flanges and with efficient water cooling. 3- Exit Windows: Vacuum exit windows come in a variety of materials including Beryllium and CVD diamond detailed above.

- Slits: Slits are used to define the beam either horizontally or vertically. They can be used in pairs to define the beam in both directions. the maximum aperture size is selected to suit specific requirements. Options include cooled (white beam operation) or uncooled (monochromatic beam operation) slits and phosphor coating on the upstream side of the slit to assist with beam location. There are four main type of slits: Blade Slits, High Heat Load Slits, Inline Slits, High Precision Slits.
- Shutters: Beam shutters are used to interrupt radiation from the front end, or optics enclosures when it is not required downstream. They have an equipment and personnel safety function. And there are three types of shutters; Photon Shutters, Monochromatic Beam Shutters, Custom Shutters
- Beam Filters: (or attenuators) remove unwanted energy ranges from the beam by passing the incident synchrotron radiation through a thin transmissive foil. They are often used to manage heat-loads of white beams to optimize beamline performance according to the energy of operation. A typical filter has two or three racks, with each rack holding three of four separate foils, depending upon the beam cross-section.
- Focusing mirrors - one or more mirrors, which may be flat, bent-flat, or toroidal, which helps to collimate (focus) the beam
- Monochromators - devices based on diffraction by crystals which select particular wavelength bands and absorb other wavelengths, and which are sometimes tunable to varying wavelengths, and sometimes fixed to a particular wavelength
- Spacing tubes - vacuum maintaining tubes which provide the proper space between optical elements, and shield any scattered radiation
- Sample stages - for mounting and manipulating the sample under study and subjecting it to various external conditions, such a varying temperature, pressure etc.
- Radiation detectors - for measuring the radiation which has interacted with the sample

The combination of beam conditioning devices controls the thermal load (heating caused by the beam) at the end station; the spectrum of radiation incident at the end station; and the focus or collimation of the beam. Devices along the beamline which absorb significant power from the beam may need to be actively cooled by water, or liquid nitrogen. The entire length of a beamline is normally kept under ultra high vacuum conditions.

=== Software for beamline modeling ===
Although the design of a synchrotron radiation beamline may be seen as an application of X-ray optics, there are dedicated tools for modeling the x-ray propagation down the beamline and their interaction with various components. Ray-tracing code such as SHADOW, RAY-UI, and McXTrace treat the x-ray beam in the geometric optics limit, and wave propagation software can take into account diffraction and the intrinsic wavelike properties of the radiation. For the purposes of understanding full or partial coherence of the synchrotron radiation, code such as SRW, Spectra and xrt can take this into account.

== Neutron beamline ==
Superficially, neutron beamlines differ from synchrotron radiation beamlines mostly by the fact that they use neutrons from a research reactor or a spallation source instead of photons. Since neutrons don't carry charge and are difficult to redirect, the components are quite different (see e.g. choppers or neutron super mirrors). The experiments usually measure neutron scattering from or energy transfer to the sample under study.

== See also ==
- Ion beam
- Category:Neutron facilities
- Klystron
