= Kicker magnet =

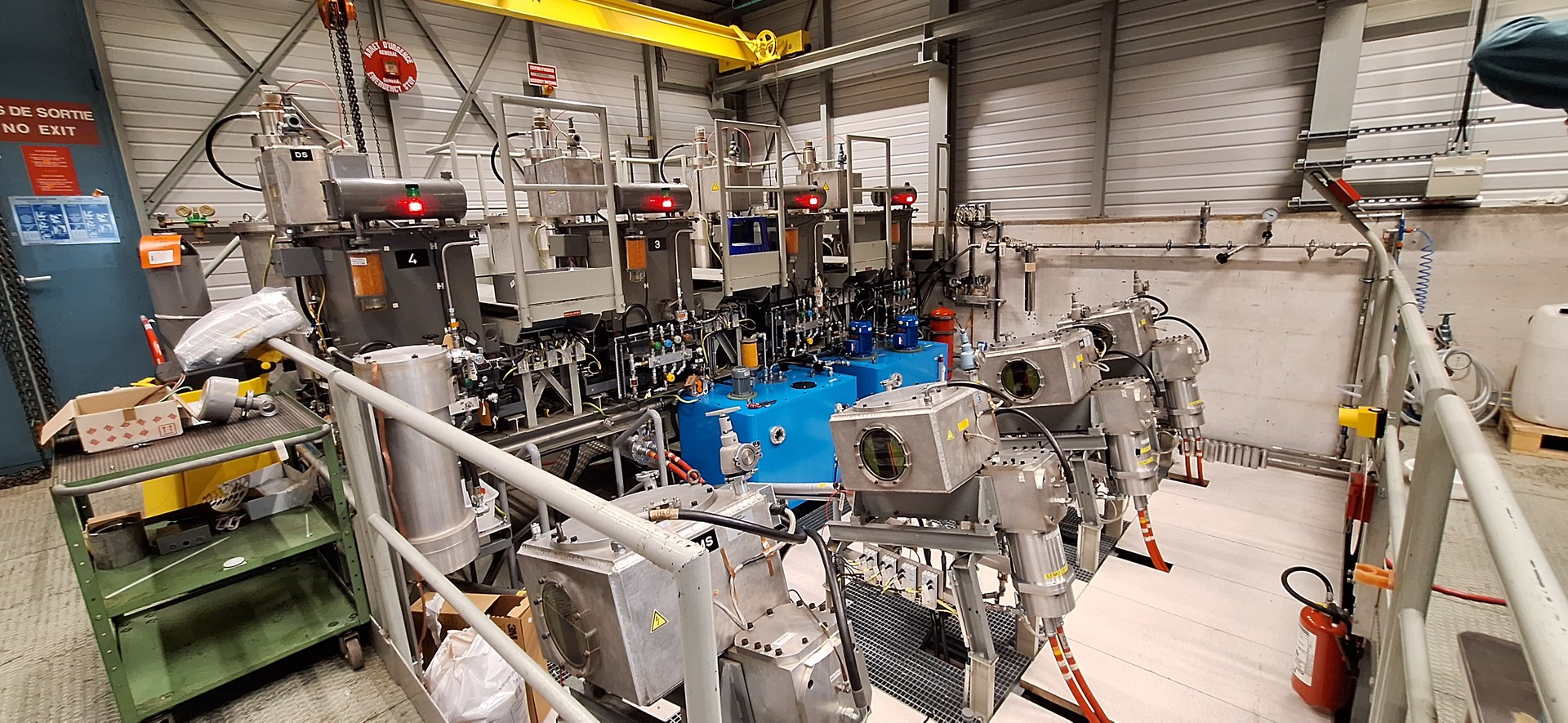
Injection kicker magnet KF45 for the PS accelerator, CERN, Meyrin Campus

Kicker magnets are dipole magnets used to rapidly switch a particle beam between two paths. Conceptually similar to a railroad switch in function, a kicker magnet must switch on very rapidly, then maintain a stable magnetic field for some minimum time. Switch-off time is also important, but less critical.

An injection kicker magnet merges two beams incoming from different directions. Most commonly, there is a beam circulating in a synchrotron, in the form of a particle train which only partially fills the arc. As soon as the circulating particle train has passed the kicker, it is switched on so that an additional batch of particles may be appended to the train. The magnet must then be switched off in time to not affect the head of the train when it next rounds the synchrotron.

An ejection kicker magnet does the opposite, diverting a circulating beam so it leaves the synchrotron. Almost always, an ejection kicker is used to eject the entire particle train, emptying the synchrotron. This means that it has the entire tail-to-head gap in the synchrotron to function, and the switch-off time is essentially irrelevant. However, it must hold a stable field for longer (one full rotation of the synchrotron), and must generate a stronger magnetic field, as it is used to eject a higher energy beam that has been accelerated in the synchrotron.

The magnets are powered by a high voltage (usually in the range of tens of thousands of volts) source called a power modulator which uses a pulse forming network to produce a short pulse of current (usually in the range of a few nanoseconds to a microsecond and thousands of amperes in amplitude). The current produces a magnetic field in the magnet, which in turn imparts a Lorentz force on the particles as they traverse the magnet's length, causing the beam to deflect into the proper trajectory.

Because a kicker magnet applies a particular lateral impulse to the beam, to achieve a fixed deflection angle the strength of the kick must be accurately matched to the momentum of the particles. This is part of the power modulator's job.
