= Synchrotron =

Type of cyclic particle accelerator

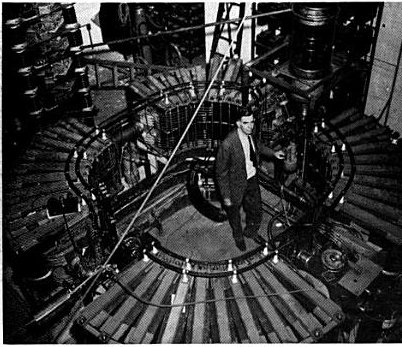
The first synchrotron to use the "racetrack" design with straight sections, a 300 MeV electron synchrotron at University of Michigan in 1949, designed by Dick Crane

A synchrotron is a particular type of cyclic particle accelerator, descended from the cyclotron, in which the accelerating particle beam travels around a fixed closed-loop path. The strength of the magnetic field which bends the particle beam into its closed path increases during the accelerating process, being synchronized to the increasing kinetic energy of the particles.

The synchrotron is one of the first accelerator concepts to enable the construction of big facilities, since bending, beam focusing and acceleration can be separated. The most powerful modern particle accelerators use versions of the synchrotron design. The largest synchrotron-type accelerator, also the largest particle accelerator in the world, is the 27-kilometre-circumference (17 mi) Large Hadron Collider (LHC) near Geneva, Switzerland, completed in 2008 by the European Organization for Nuclear Research (CERN). It can accelerate beams of protons to an energy of 7 teraelectronvolts (7 TeV or 7×10^{12} eV).

== Types ==
Large synchrotrons usually have a linear accelerator (linac) to give the particles an initial acceleration, and a lower energy synchrotron which is sometimes called a booster to increase the energy of the particles before they are injected into the high energy synchrotron ring. Several specialized types of synchrotron machines are used today:

- A collider is a type in which, instead of the particles striking a stationary target, particles traveling in two countercirculating rings collide head-on, making higher-energy collisions possible.
- A storage ring is a special type of synchrotron in which the kinetic energy of the particles is kept constant.
- A synchrotron light source is a combination of different electron accelerator types, including a storage ring in which the desired electromagnetic radiation is generated. This radiation is then used in experimental stations located on different beamlines. Synchrotron light sources in their entirety are sometimes called "synchrotrons", although this is technically incorrect.

== Principle of operation ==
The synchrotron evolved from the cyclotron, the first cyclic particle accelerator. While a classical cyclotron uses both a constant guiding magnetic field and a constant-frequency electromagnetic field (and is working in classical approximation), its successor, the isochronous cyclotron, works by local variations of the guiding magnetic field, adapting to the increasing relativistic mass of particles during acceleration.

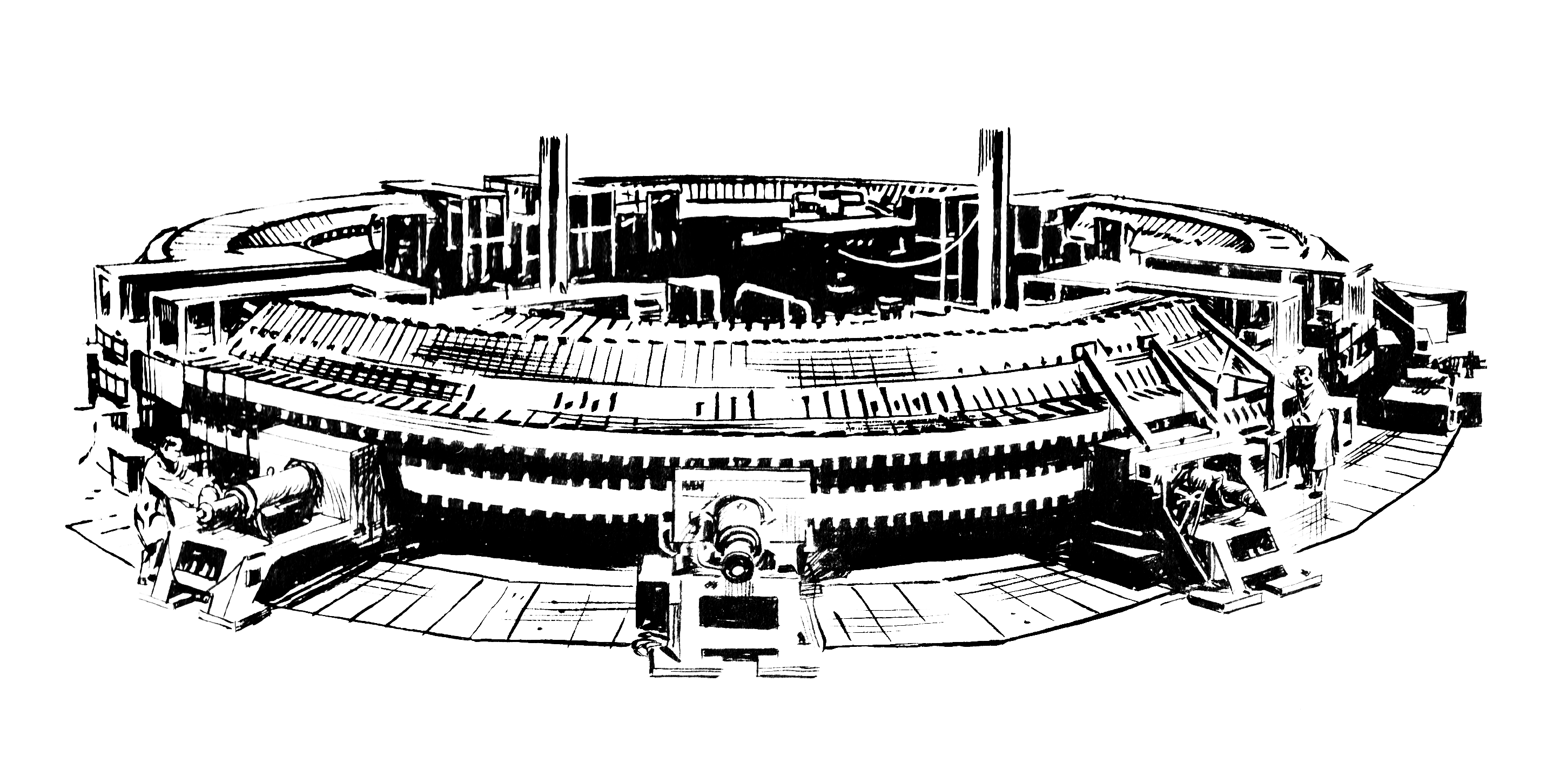
A drawing of the Cosmotron

In a synchrotron, the strength of magnetic field and RF frequency is varied during acceleration. For particles that are not close to the speed of light, the frequency of the applied electromagnetic field may also change to follow their non-constant circulation time. By increasing these parameters accordingly as the particles gain energy, their circulation path can be held constant as they are accelerated. This allows the vacuum chamber for the particles to be a large thin torus, rather than a disk as in previous, compact accelerator designs. Also, the thin profile of the vacuum chamber allowed for a more efficient use of magnetic fields than in a cyclotron, enabling the cost-effective construction of larger synchrotrons.

While the first synchrotrons and storage rings like the Cosmotron and ADA strictly used the toroid shape, the strong focusing principle independently discovered by Ernest Courant et al. and Nicholas Christofilos allowed the complete separation of the accelerator into components with specialized functions along the particle path, shaping the path into a round-cornered polygon. Some important components are given by radio frequency cavities for direct acceleration, dipole magnets (bending magnets) for deflection of particles (to close the path), and quadrupole / sextupole magnets for beam focusing.

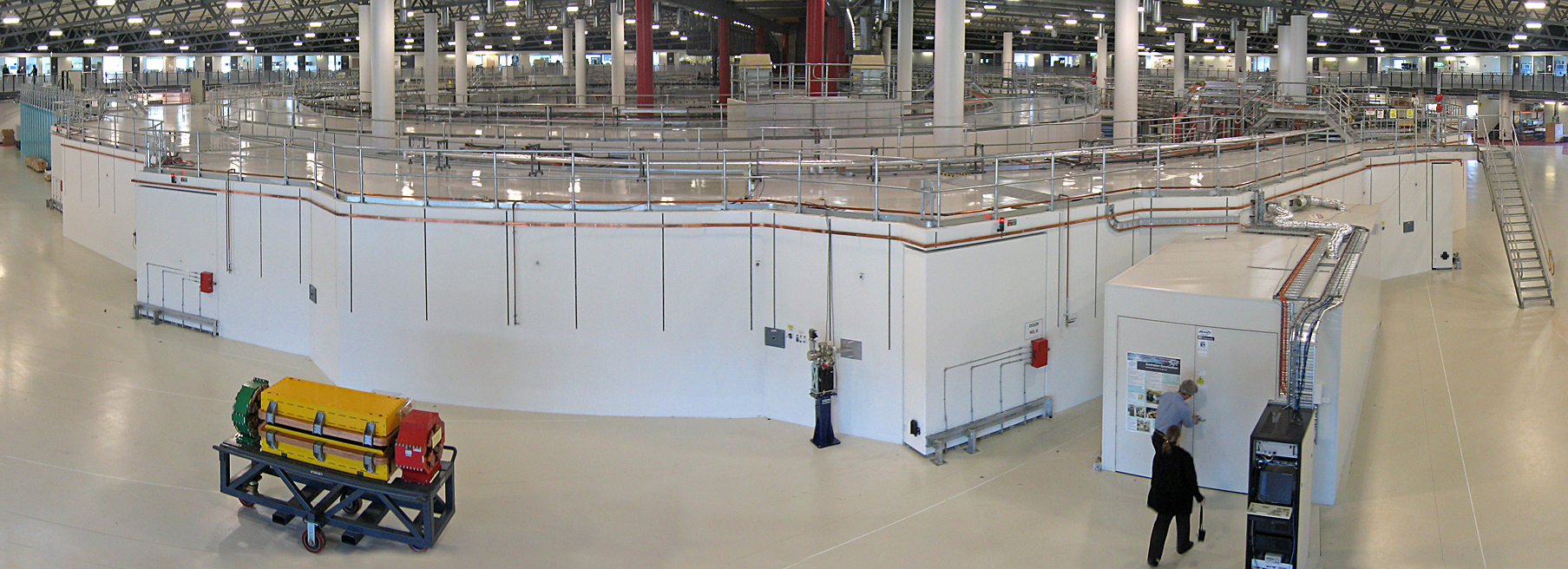
The interior of the Australian Synchrotron facility, a synchrotron light source. Dominating the image is the storage ring, showing a beamline at front right. The storage ring's interior includes a synchrotron and a linac.

The combination of time-dependent guiding magnetic fields and the strong focusing principle enabled the design and operation of modern large-scale accelerator facilities like colliders and synchrotron light sources. The straight sections along the closed path in such facilities are not only required for radio frequency cavities, but also for particle detectors (in colliders) and photon generation devices such as wigglers and undulators (in third generation synchrotron light sources).

The maximum energy that a cyclic accelerator can impart is typically limited by the maximum strength of the magnetic fields and the minimum radius (maximum curvature) of the particle path. Thus one method for increasing the energy limit is to use superconducting magnets, these not being limited by magnetic saturation. Electron/positron accelerators may also be limited by the emission of synchrotron radiation, resulting in a partial loss of the particle beam's kinetic energy. The limiting beam energy is reached when the energy lost to the lateral acceleration required to maintain the beam path in a circle equals the energy added each cycle.

More powerful accelerators are built by using large radius paths and by using more numerous and more powerful microwave cavities. Lighter particles (such as electrons) lose a larger fraction of their energy when deflected. Practically speaking, the energy of electron/positron accelerators is limited by this radiation loss, while this does not play a significant role in the dynamics of proton or ion accelerators. The energy of such accelerators is limited strictly by the strength of magnets and by the cost.

=== Injection procedure ===
Unlike a cyclotron, synchrotrons are unable to accelerate particles from zero kinetic energy; one of the obvious reasons for this is that its closed particle path would be cut by a device that emits particles. Thus, schemes were developed to inject pre-accelerated particle beams into a synchrotron. The pre-acceleration can be realized by a chain of other accelerator structures like a linac, a microtron or another synchrotron; all of these in turn need to be fed by a particle source comprising a simple high voltage power supply, typically a Cockcroft–Walton generator.

Starting from an appropriate initial value determined by the injection energy, the field strength of the dipole magnets is then increased. If the high energy particles are emitted at the end of the acceleration procedure, e.g. to a target or to another accelerator, the field strength is again decreased to injection level, starting a new injection cycle. Depending on the method of magnet control used, the time interval for one cycle can vary substantially between different installations.

== History and development ==
=== First generation synchrotrons ===
The synchrotron principle was proposed by Vladimir Veksler in 1944. Edwin McMillan constructed the first electron synchrotron in 1945, arriving at the idea independently, having missed Veksler's publication (which was only available in a Soviet journal, although in English).

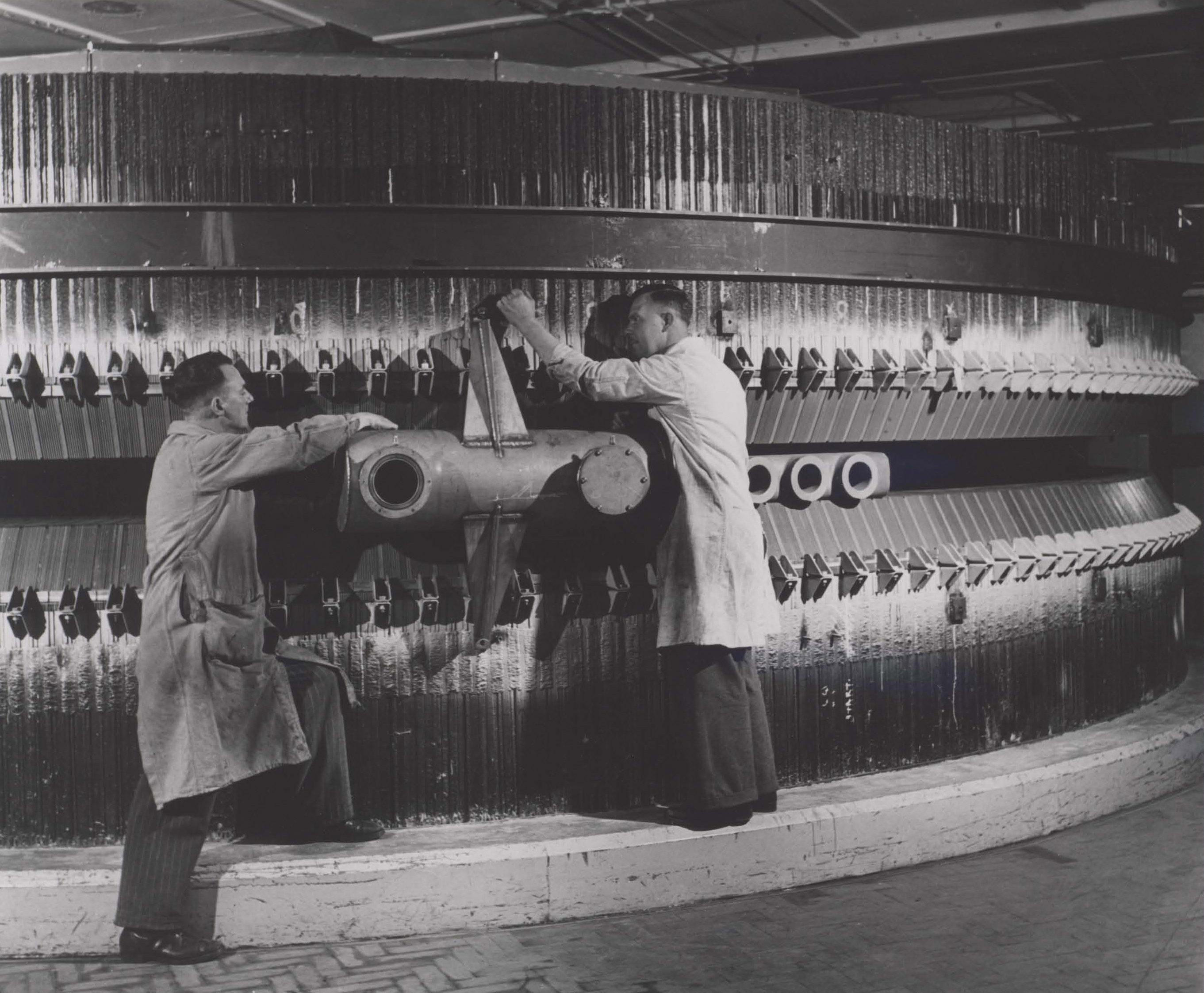
The Birmingham proton synchrotron under construction

The first proton synchrotron was designed by Sir Marcus Oliphant and constructed at the University of Birmingham in 1952. In 1963, McMillan and Veksler were jointly awarded the Atoms for Peace Prize for the invention of the synchrotron.

One of the early large synchrotrons is the Bevatron, constructed in 1950 at the Lawrence Berkeley Laboratory. The Bevatron can accelerate a proton with an energy of 6.2 GeV(then called BeV for billion electron volts; the name predates the adoption of the SI prefix giga-). It can also accelerate heavier ions, such as deuterons, alpha-particles, and nitrogen. A number of transuranium elements, unseen in the natural world, were first created with this instrument. This site is also the location of one of the first large bubble chambers are produced to examine the results of atomic collisions produced here. In 1955, physicists Owen Chamberlain and Emilio Segrè had used the Bevatron to detect evidence for the existence of antiproton, for which they received the 1959 Nobel Prize in Physics. The Bevatron was retired in February 1993.

Another early large synchrotron is the Cosmotron built at Brookhaven National Laboratory which reached 3.3 GeV in 1953.

=== Second generation synchrotrons ===
In the 1980s, detail about the second generation of synchrotrons began to emerge. These devices were constructed specifically for experiments with producing synchrotron radiation rather than particle physics research The 2 GeV Synchrotron Radiation Source (SRS) at Daresbury, England, which operated in 1981, was the first of these "second-generation" synchrotron sources. Additionally, first generation synchrotrons are upgraded to become second generation sources.

=== As part of colliders ===
Until August 2008, the highest energy collider in the world was the Tevatron, at the Fermi National Accelerator Laboratory, in the United States. It accelerated protons and antiprotons to slightly less than 1 TeV of kinetic energy and collided them together. The Large Hadron Collider (LHC), which has been built at the European Laboratory for High Energy Physics (CERN), has roughly seven times this energy (so proton-proton collisions occur at roughly 14 TeV). It is housed in the 27.6 km tunnel which formerly housed the Large Electron Positron (LEP) collider. The LHC will also accelerate heavy ions (such as lead) up to an energy of 1.15 PeV upon collision. As of 2025, it is considered the largest and most powerful particle colldier.

The largest device of this type seriously proposed was the Superconducting Super Collider (SSC), which was to be built in the United States. This design, like others, used superconducting magnets which allow more intense magnetic fields to be created without the limitations of core saturation. While construction was begun, the project was cancelled in 1994, citing excessive budget overruns due to naïve cost estimation and economic management issues. It can also be argued that the end of the Cold War resulted in a change of scientific funding priorities that contributed to its ultimate cancellation. However, the tunnel built for its placement still remains, although empty. While there is still potential for yet more powerful proton and heavy particle cyclic accelerators, it appears that the next step up in electron beam energy must avoid losses due to synchrotron radiation. This will require a return to the linear accelerator, but with devices significantly longer than those currently in use. There is at present a major effort to design and build the International Linear Collider (ILC), which will consist of two opposing linear accelerators, one for electrons and one for positrons. These will collide at a total center of mass energy of 0.5 TeV.

=== As part of synchrotron light sources ===
Synchrotron radiation has a wide range of applications (see synchrotron light) and many second and third generation synchrotrons have been built especially to harness it. The largest of those 3rd generation synchrotron light sources are the European Synchrotron Radiation Facility (ESRF) in Grenoble, France, the Advanced Photon Source (APS) in Lemont, United States, and SPring-8 in Hyōgo, Japan, accelerating electrons up to 6, 7 and 8 GeV, respectively.

Synchrotrons are large devices, costing tens or hundreds of millions of dollars to construct, and each beamline (there may be 20 to 50 at a large synchrotron) costs another two or three million dollars on average. These installations also require a large footprint. More compact models, such as the Munich Compact Light Source, have been developed and tested.

Among the few synchrotrons around the world, 16 are located in the United States. Many of them belong to national laboratories; few are located in universities.

== Applications ==
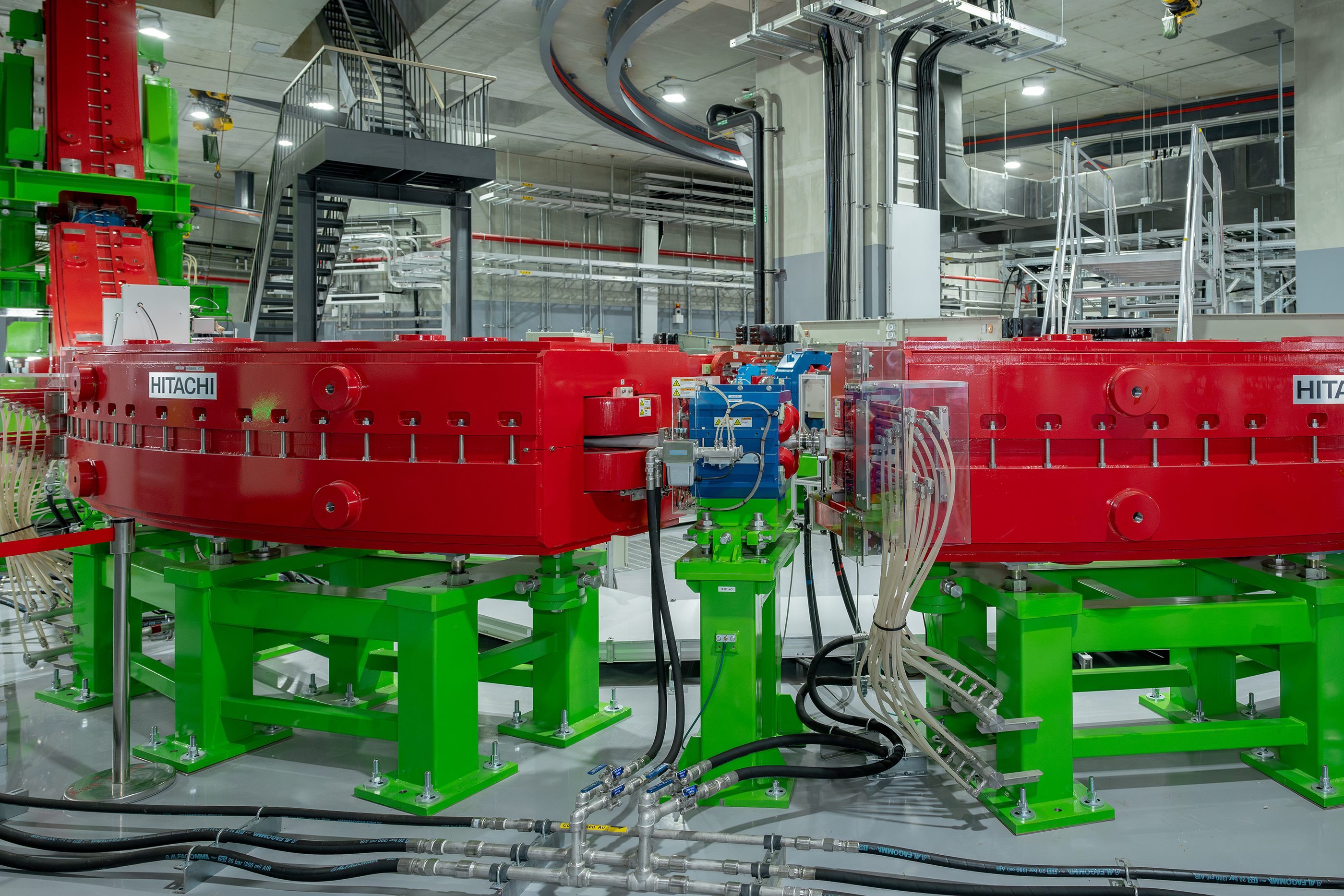
Hitachi synchrotron used for heavy ion particle therapy

- Life sciences: protein and large-molecule crystallography
- LIGA based microfabrication
- Drug discovery and research
- X-ray lithography
- X-ray microtomography
- Analysing chemicals to determine their composition
- Observing the reaction of living cells to drugs
- Inorganic material crystallography and microanalysis
- Fluorescence studies
- Semiconductor material analysis and structural studies
- Geological material analysis
- Medical imaging
- Particle therapy to treat some forms of cancer
- Radiometry: calibration of detectors and radiometric standards

== See also ==
- List of synchrotron radiation facilities
- Synchrotron radiation
- Cyclotron radiation
- Computed X-ray tomography
- Energy amplifier
- Superconducting radio frequency
- Coherent diffraction imaging
