= Château de Puy-Launay =

French ruined castle

Coordinates: 44°39′59″N 2°06′55″E

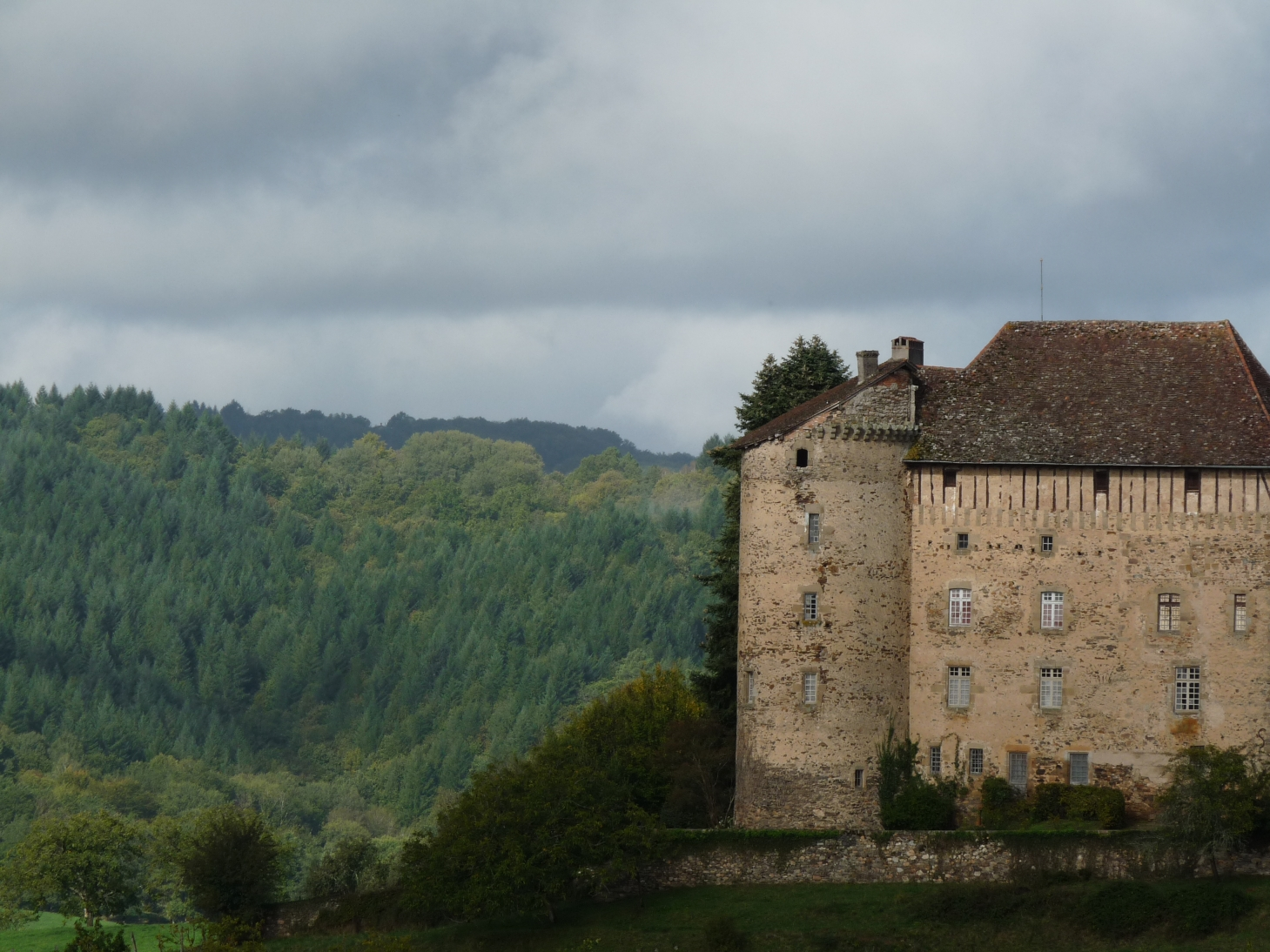
Facade of Puy launay linac castle

The Château de Puy-Launay is a ruined castle in the commune of Linac in the Lot département of France.

A castle has existed on the site since the 14th centuries. It underwent major building works in the 15th century. The building is a three-storey latticed quadrangular structure. The north east corner forms a nook partly occupied by a square tower containing a spiral staircase. Two round towers, flanking the southern façade, were razed during the French Revolution. A round walk constructed of brick and wooden walls is still visible. In the basement are traces of an earlier keep. On the first floor, a large hall is decorated with paintings of floral and plant motifs imitating a tapestry, dating certainly from the 19th century. The so-called Francis I Room has a 17th-century ceiling.

The castle is privately owned. It has been listed since 1989 as a monument historique by the French Ministry of Culture.

== See also ==
- List of castles in France
