= Storage ring =

Type of particle accelerator

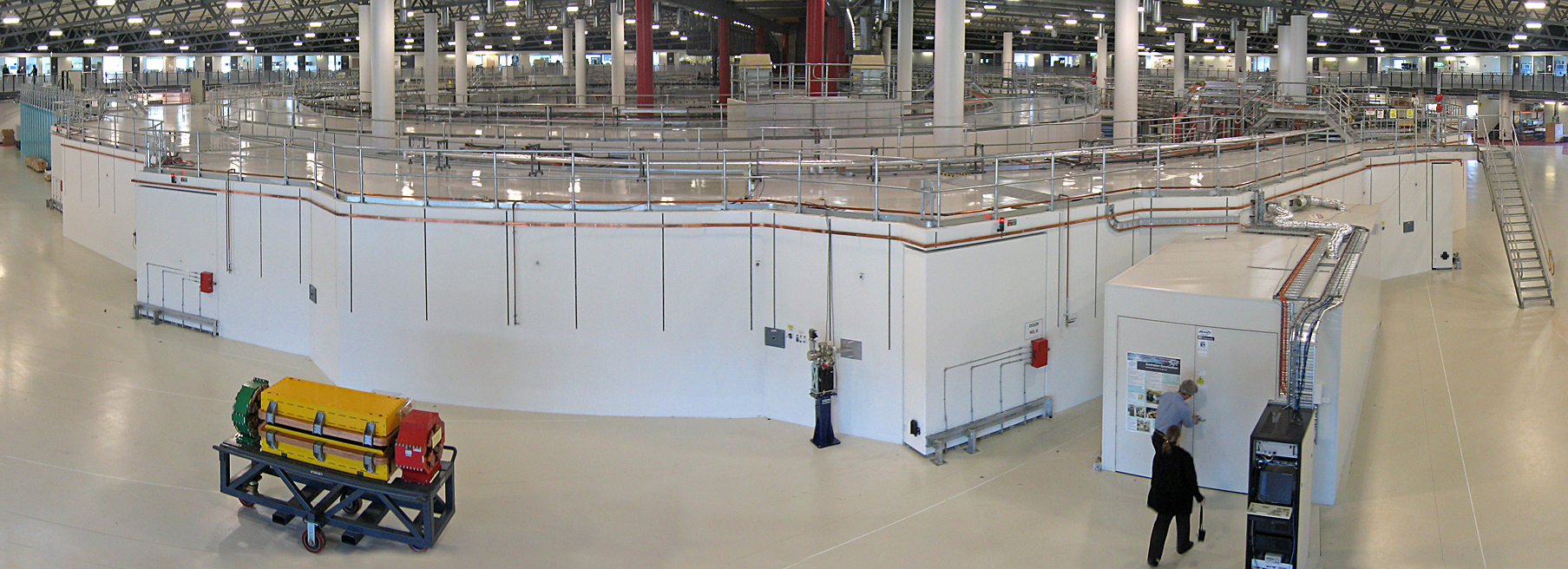
The 216-m-circumference storage ring dominates this image of the interior of the Australian Synchrotron facility. In the middle of the storage ring is the booster ring and linac.

A storage ring is a type of circular particle accelerator in which a continuous or pulsed particle beam may be kept circulating, typically for many hours. Storage of a particular particle depends upon the mass, momentum, and usually the charge of the particle to be stored. Storage rings most commonly store electrons, positrons, or protons.

Storage rings are most often used to store electrons that radiate synchrotron radiation. Over 50 facilities based on electron storage rings exist and are used for a variety of studies in chemistry and biology. Storage rings can also be used to produce polarized high-energy electron beams through the Sokolov-Ternov effect. The best-known application of storage rings is their use in particle accelerators and in particle colliders, where two counter-rotating beams of stored particles are brought into collision at discrete locations. The resulting subatomic interactions are then studied in a surrounding particle detector. Examples of such facilities are LHC, LEP, PEP-II, KEKB, RHIC, Tevatron, and HERA.

A storage ring is a type of synchrotron. While a conventional synchrotron serves to accelerate particles from a low to a high energy state with the aid of radio-frequency accelerating cavities, a storage ring keeps particles stored at a constant energy and radio-frequency cavities are only used to replace energy lost through synchrotron radiation and other processes.

Gerard K. O'Neill proposed the use of storage rings as building blocks for a collider in 1956. A key benefit of storage rings in this context is that the storage ring can accumulate a high beam flux from an injection accelerator that achieves a much lower flux.

== Important considerations for particle-beam storage ==
=== Magnets ===
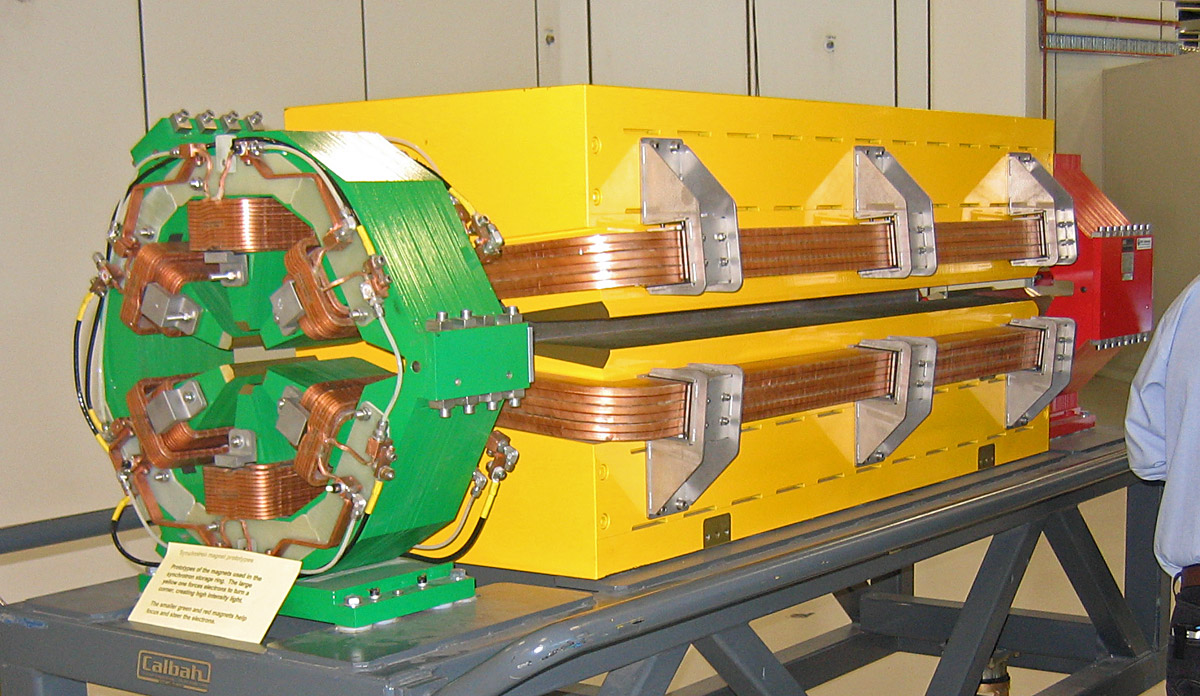
Different types of magnets used in the storage ring of the Australian Synchrotron. The larger yellow one is a dipole magnet used to bend the electron beam and produce the synchrotron radiation. The green one is a sextupole magnet and the red one (behind the dipole) is a quadrupole magnet; these are used for focusing and to maintain chromaticity respectively.

A force must be applied to particles in such a way that they are constrained to move in an approximately-circular path. This may be accomplished using either dipole electrostatic or dipole magnetic fields, but because most storage rings store relativistic charged particles, it turns out that it is most practical to use magnetic fields produced by dipole magnets. However, electrostatic accelerators have been built to store very-low-energy particles, and quadrupole fields may be used to store (uncharged) neutrons; these are comparatively rare, however.

Dipole magnets alone only provide what is called weak focusing, and a storage ring composed of only these sorts of magnetic elements results in the particles having a relatively large beam size. Interleaving dipole magnets with an appropriate arrangement of quadrupole and sextupole magnets can give a suitable strong focusing system that can give a much smaller beam size. The FODO and Chasman-Green lattice structures are simple examples of strong focusing systems, but there are many others.

Dipole and quadrupole magnets deflect different particle energies by differing amounts, a property called chromaticity by analogy with physical optics. The spread of energies that is inherently present in any practical stored-particle beam will therefore give rise to a spread of transverse and longitudinal focusing, as well as contributing to various particle beam instabilities. Sextupole magnets (and higher-order magnets) are used to correct for this phenomenon, but this in turn gives rise to nonlinear motion that is one of the main problems facing designers of storage rings.

=== Vacuum ===
As the bunches will travel many millions of kilometers (considering that they will be moving at near the speed of light for many hours), any residual gas in the beam pipe will result in many, many collisions. This will have the effect of increasing the size of the bunch, and increasing the energy spread. Therefore, a better vacuum yields better beam dynamics. Also, single large-angle scattering events from either the residual gas, or from other particles in the bunch (Touschek effect), can eject particles far enough that they are lost on the walls of the accelerator vacuum vessel. This gradual loss of particles is called beam lifetime, and means that storage rings must be periodically injected with a new complement of particles.

=== Particle injection and timing ===
Injection of particles into a storage ring may be accomplished in a number of ways, depending on the application of the storage ring. The simplest method uses one or more pulsed deflecting dipole magnets (injection kicker magnets) to steer an incoming train of particles onto the stored beam path; the kicker magnets are turned off before the stored train returns to the injection point, thus resulting in a stored beam. This method is sometimes called single-turn injection.

Multi-turn injection allows accumulation of many incoming trains of particles, such as when a large stored current is required. For particles such as protons where there is no significant beam damping, each injected pulse is placed onto a particular point in the stored beam transverse or longitudinal phase space, taking care to not eject previously-injected trains by using a careful arrangement of beam deflection and coherent oscillations in the stored beam. If there is significant beam damping, for example by radiation damping of electrons due to synchrotron radiation, then an injected pulse may be placed on the edge of phase space and then left to damp in transverse phase space into the stored beam before injecting a further pulse. Typical damping times from synchrotron radiation are tens of milliseconds, allowing many pulses per second to be accumulated.

If extraction of particles is required (for example in a chain of accelerators), then single-turn extraction may be performed analogously to injection. Resonant extraction may also be employed.

=== Beam dynamics ===
The particles must be stored for very large numbers of turns, potentially larger than 10 billion. This long-term stability is challenging, and one must combine the magnet design with tracking codes and analytical tools in order to understand and optimize the long term stability.

In the case of electron storage rings, radiation damping eases the stability problem by providing a non-Hamiltonian motion returning the electrons to the design orbit on the order of the thousands of turns. Together with diffusion from the fluctuations in the radiated photon energies, an equilibrium beam distribution is reached. One may look at for further details on some of these topics.

== See also ==
- List of synchrotron radiation facilities
