= Sextupole magnet =

Component

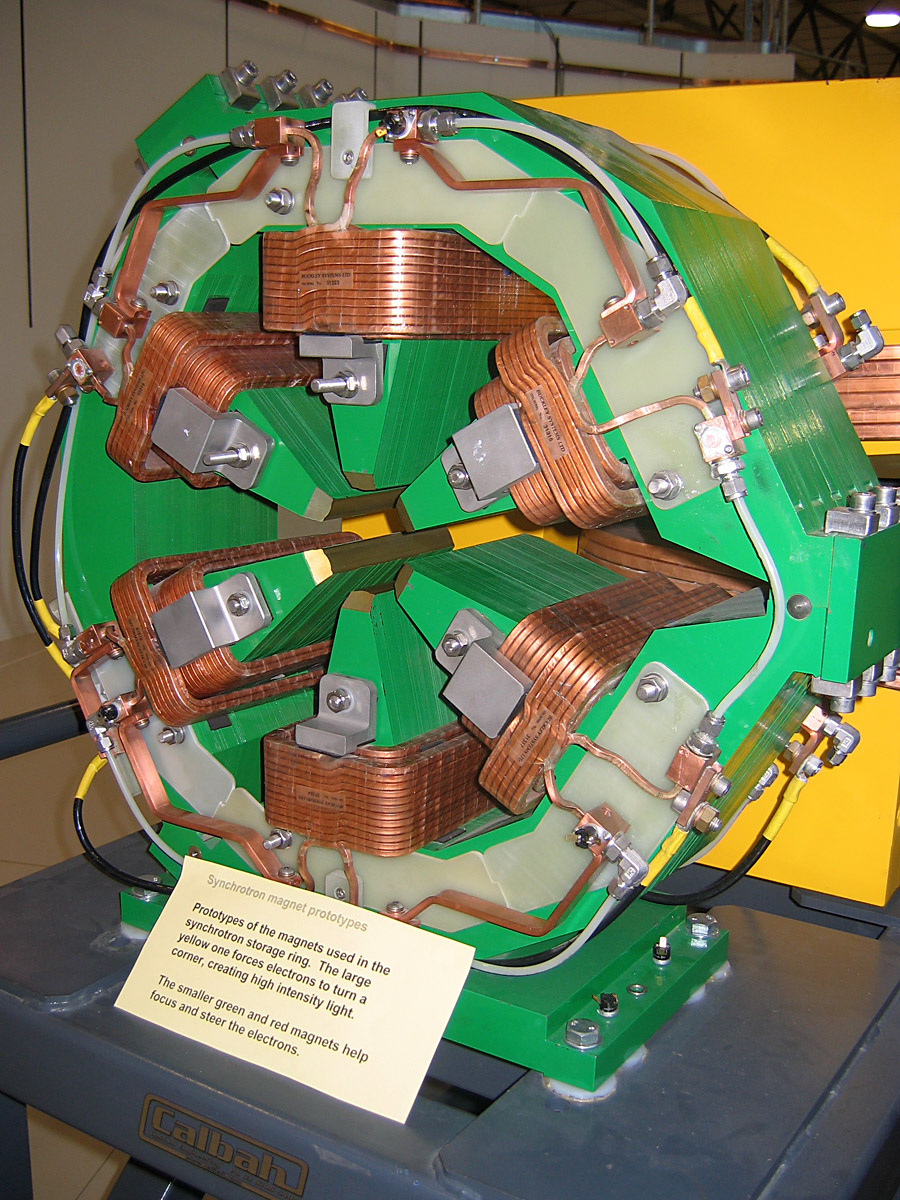
Sextupole electromagnet as used within the storage ring of the Australian Synchrotron to correct chromatic aberrations of the electron beam

Field lines of an idealized sextupole magnet in the plane transverse to the beam direction

A sextupole magnet (also known as a hexapole magnet) consists of six magnetic poles set out in an arrangement of alternating north and south poles arranged around an axis. They are widely used in circular particle accelerators for the control of chromatic aberrations that in turn helps to damp the head—tail transverse instability. Two sets of sextupole magnets are used in transmission electron microscopes to correct for spherical aberration.

The design of sextupoles using electromagnets generally involves six steel pole tips of alternating polarity. The steel is magnetised by a large electric current that flows in the coils of wire wrapped around the poles. The coils may be formed from hollow copper magnet wire that carry coolant, usually de-ionized water. The current density of such a conductor can be above 10 amps/mm^{2} (four times that of standard copper conductors).

== In particle accelerators ==
At the energies reached in high energy particle accelerators, magnetic deflection is more powerful than electrostatic, and use of the magnetic term of the Lorentz force:

$$\mathbf{F} = q (\mathbf{E} + \mathbf{v} \times \mathbf{B}),$$

is enabled with various magnets that make up 'the lattice' required to bend, steer and focus a charged particle beam.

The quadrupole magnets used to focus and combine the beam have the unfortunate property that their focusing strength (describable by a focal length) is dependent on the energy of the particle being focused—high energy particles having longer focal lengths than those with lower energy. Since all realistic beams have some, non-negligible, energy spread, any focusing scheme that relies purely on quadrupole magnets will result in the size of the beam "blowing up" with distance.

In linear accelerators this is due to the under- or over-focusing of the particles, while in storage rings it is related to the chromaticity of the ring (the tendency for off-energy particles to have different values for the betatron phase advance per orbit). Typically these effects are controlled with the addition of sextupolar fields.

Sextupolar fields have a focal length that is inversely proportional to the distance from the center of the magnet with which the particle passes. This is similar to the action of a quadrupole, whose effect on the beam may be described as a bending whose strength depends on the distance from the center of the magnet.

If a sextupole is placed at a point at which the particles in the beam are arranged by their energy offset (i.e. a region of non-zero dispersion), then the sextupole can be set at a strength that ensures that particles of all reasonable energy offsets are focused to the same point. This will negate the tendency of the quadrupole lattice to disperse the beam.

== Problems ==
Sextupolar fields are non-linear (i.e. they depend on the product of the sizes of the transverse displacements), and have terms which depend on both the horizontal and vertical offsets (i.e. they are coupled).

This leads to equations of motion that cannot be solved for the general case, thus requiring approximations to be used when calculating their effects on the beam.

In addition, the quadrature dependence of the sextupole kick on the transverse offset of the beam, can lead to high amplitude particles being kicked far from the beam axis and being lost on the beam-pipe walls. Due to this mechanism, the addition of sextupole fields to an accelerator lattice will limit the dynamic aperture or acceptance of the accelerator.

== See also ==
- Charged particle beam
- Dipole magnet
- Electron optics
- Halbach cylinder
- Multipole magnet
- Quadrupole magnet
