= Multipole magnet =

Type of magnet

Multipole magnets are magnets built from multiple individual magnets, typically used to control beams of charged particles. Each type of magnet serves a particular purpose.

- Dipole magnets are used to bend the trajectory of particles
- Quadrupole magnets are used to focus particle beams
- Sextupole magnets are used to correct for chromaticity introduced by quadrupole magnets

== Magnetic field equations ==
The magnetic field of an ideal multipole magnet in an accelerator is typically modeled as having no (or a constant) component parallel to the nominal beam direction ($z$ direction) and the transverse components can be written as complex numbers:

$B_y + i B_x = C_n \cdot ( x - iy )^{n-1}$

where $x$ and $y$ are the coordinates in the plane transverse to the nominal beam direction. $C_n$ is a complex number specifying the orientation and strength of the magnetic field. $B_x$ and $B_y$ are the components of the magnetic field in the corresponding directions. Fields with a real $C_n$ are called 'normal' while fields with $C_n$ purely imaginary are called 'skewed'.

First few multipole fields
n	name	magnetic field lines	example device
1	dipole		
2	quadrupole		
3	sextupole		

== Stored energy equation ==
For an electromagnet with a cylindrical bore, producing a pure multipole field of order $n$, the stored magnetic energy is:

$U_n = \frac{n!^2}{2n} \pi \mu_0 \ell N^2 I^2 .$

Here, $\mu_0$ is the permeability of free space, $\ell$ is the effective length of the magnet (the length of the magnet, including the fringing fields), $N$ is the number of turns in one of the coils (such that the entire device has $2nN$ turns), and $I$ is the current flowing in the coils. Formulating the energy in terms of $NI$ can be useful, since the magnitude of the field and the bore radius do not need to be measured.

Note that for a non-electromagnet, this equation still holds if the magnetic excitation can be expressed in Amperes.

=== Derivation ===
The equation for stored energy in an arbitrary magnetic field is:

$U = \frac{1}{2}\int \left(\frac{B^2}{\mu_0} \right)\,d\tau.$

Here, $\mu_0$ is the permeability of free space, $B$ is the magnitude of the field, and $d\tau$ is an infinitesimal element of volume. Now for an electromagnet with a cylindrical bore of radius $R$, producing a pure multipole field of order $n$, this integral becomes:

$U_{n} = \frac{1}{2\mu_0} \int^\ell\int^R_0\int^{2\pi}_0 B^2 \,d\tau.$

Ampere's Law for multipole electromagnets gives the field within the bore as:

$B(r) = \frac{n!\mu_0 NI}{R^n} r^{n-1}.$

Here, $r$ is the radial coordinate. It can be seen that along $r$ the field of a dipole is constant, the field of a quadrupole magnet is linearly increasing (i.e. has a constant gradient), and the field of a sextupole magnet is parabolically increasing (i.e. has a constant second derivative). Substituting this equation into the previous equation for $U_{n}$ gives:

$U_{n} = \frac{1}{2\mu_0} \int^\ell\int^R_0\int^{2\pi}_0 \left(\frac{n!\mu_0NI}{R^n}r^{n-1}\right)^2 \,d\tau,$

$U_{n} = \frac{1}{2\mu_0} \int^R_0 \left(\frac{n!\mu_0NI}{R^n}r^{n-1}\right)^2 (2\pi\ell r\,dr),$

$U_{n} = \frac{\pi\mu_0\ell n!^2 N^2 I^2}{R^{2n}} \int^R_0 r^{2n-1}\,dr,$

$U_{n} = \frac{\pi\mu_0\ell n!^2 N^2 I^2}{R^{2n}} \left( \frac{R^{2n}}{2n} \right),$

$U_{n} = \frac{n!^2}{2n} \pi\mu_0\ell N^2 I^2.$
