= Australian Synchrotron =

Large-scale synchrotron facility in Australia

Coordinates: 37.914092°S 145.142649°E

The Australian Synchrotron is a 3 GeV national synchrotron radiation facility located in Clayton, in the south-eastern suburbs of Melbourne, Victoria. The facility opened in 2007, and is operated by the Australian Nuclear Science and Technology Organisation.

The Australian Synchrotron is a light source facility (in contrast to a collider), which uses particle accelerators to produce a beam of high energy electrons that are boosted to nearly the speed of light and directed into a storage ring where they circulate for many hours or even days at a time. As the path of these electrons are deflected in the storage ring by either bending magnets or insertion devices, they emit synchrotron light. The light is channelled to experimental endstations containing specialised equipment, enabling a range of research applications including high resolution imagery that is not possible under normal laboratory conditions.

The Australian Synchrotron supports the research needs of Australia's major universities and research centres, and businesses ranging from small-to-medium enterprises to multinational companies. During 2014–15 the Australian Synchrotron supported more than 4,300 researcher visits and close to 1,000 experiments in areas such as medicine, agriculture, environment, defence, transport, advanced manufacturing and mining.

In 2015, the Australian Government announced a ten-year, A$520 million investment in operations through ANSTO, Australia's Nuclear Science and Technology Organisation. A 1.5 MW solar power system on the roof is expected to save $2 million in electricity costs over 5 years.

In 2020, it was used to help map the molecular structure of the COVID-19 virus, during the COVID-19 pandemic.

== Accelerator systems ==
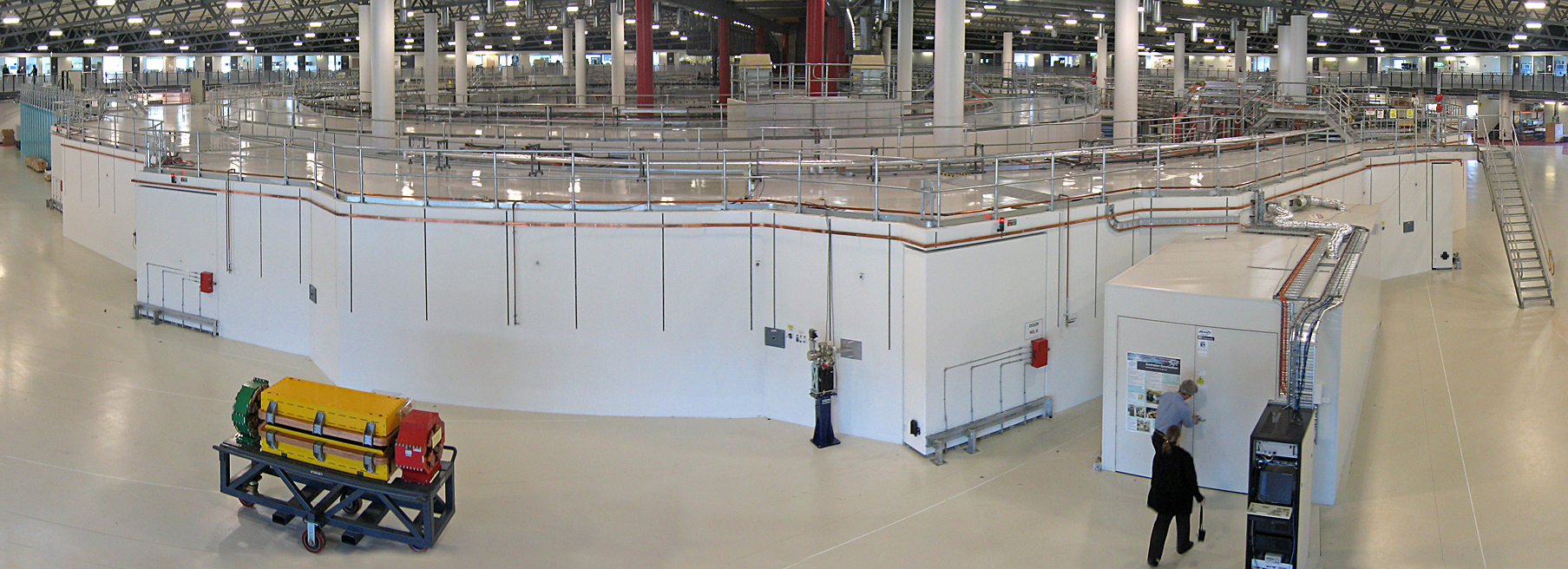
The interior of the Australian Synchrotron facility in 2006 before the beamlines were installed. Dominating the image is the storage ring, with an experimental endstation at front right. In the middle of the storage ring is the booster ring and linac.

=== Electron gun ===
The electrons used to provide the synchrotron light are first produced at the electron gun, by thermionic emission from a heated metal cathode. The emitted electrons are then accelerated to an energy of 90 keV (kilo-electron volts) by a 90 kilovolt potential applied across the gun and make their way into the linear accelerator.

=== Linear accelerator ===
The linear accelerator (or linac) uses a series of RF cavities, operating at a frequency of 3 GHz, to accelerate the electron beam to an energy of 100 MeV, over a distance of around 15 metres. Due to the nature of this acceleration, the beam must be separated into discrete packets, or 'bunches'. The bunching process is done at the start of the linac, using several 'bunching' cavities. The linac can accelerate a beam once every second. Further along the linac quadrupole magnets are used to help focus the electron beam.

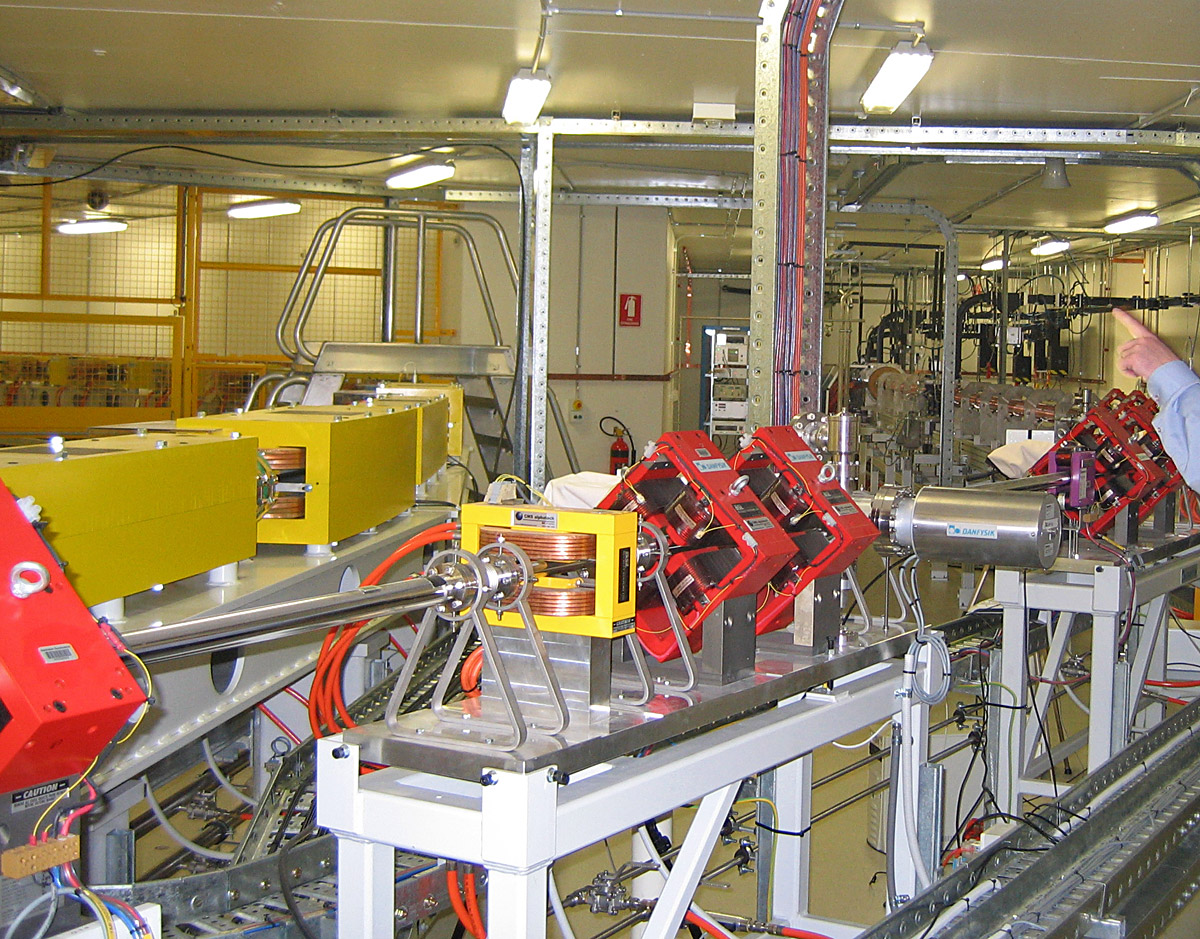
Inside the booster ring shielding, the linac is visible at image right extending from the electron gun at the far wall, and joining into the booster ring seen at the left

=== Booster synchrotron ===
The booster is an electron synchrotron which takes the 100 MeV beam from the linac and increases its energy to 3 GeV. The booster ring is 130 metres in circumference and contains a single 5-cell RF cavity (operating at 500 MHz) which provides energy to the electron beam. Acceleration of the beam is achieved by a simultaneous ramping up of the magnet strength and cavity fields. Each ramping cycle takes approximately 1 second (for a complete ramp up and down).

=== Storage ring ===
The storage ring is the final destination for the accelerated electrons. It is 216 metres in circumference and consists of 14 nearly identical sectors. Each sector consists of a straight section and an arc, with the arcs containing two dipole 'bending' magnets each. Each dipole magnet is a potential source of synchrotron light and most straight sections can also host an insertion device, giving the possibility of 30+ beamlines at the Australian Synchrotron. Two of the straight sections are used to host the storage ring 500 MHz RF cavities, which are essential for replacing the energy that the beam loses through synchrotron radiation. The storage ring also contains a large number of quadrupole and sextupole magnets used for beam focusing and chromaticity corrections. The ring is designed to hold 200 mA of stored current with a beam lifetime of over 20 hours.

=== Vacuum systems ===
The electron beam is kept within a very high vacuum at all times during the acceleration process and within the storage ring. This vacuum is necessary as any beam collisions with gas molecules will quickly degrade the beam quality and reduce the lifetime of the beam. The vacuum is achieved by enclosing the beam in a stainless steel pipe system, with numerous vacuum pump systems continually working to keep the vacuum quality high. Pressure within the storage ring is typically around 10^{−13} bar (10 nPa).

=== Control system ===
Each digital and analogue I/O channel is associated with a database entry in a customised distributed open source database system called EPICS (Experimental Physics and Industrial Control System). The condition of the system is monitored and controlled by connecting specialised GUIs to the specified database entries. There are about 1,030,000 database entries (also known as process variables), many of which relate to the physical I/O. About 950,000 of these are permanently archived at intervals ranging from tenths of a seconds to minutes.

Some high level control of the physics-related parameters of the beam is provided through MATLAB which also provides data analysis tools and an interface with a computerised model of the accelerator. Personnel and equipment protection is achieved through the use of PLC-based systems, which also transfer data to EPICS.

The Beamlines also use EPICS as the basis for their control.

== Australian Synchrotron beamlines ==
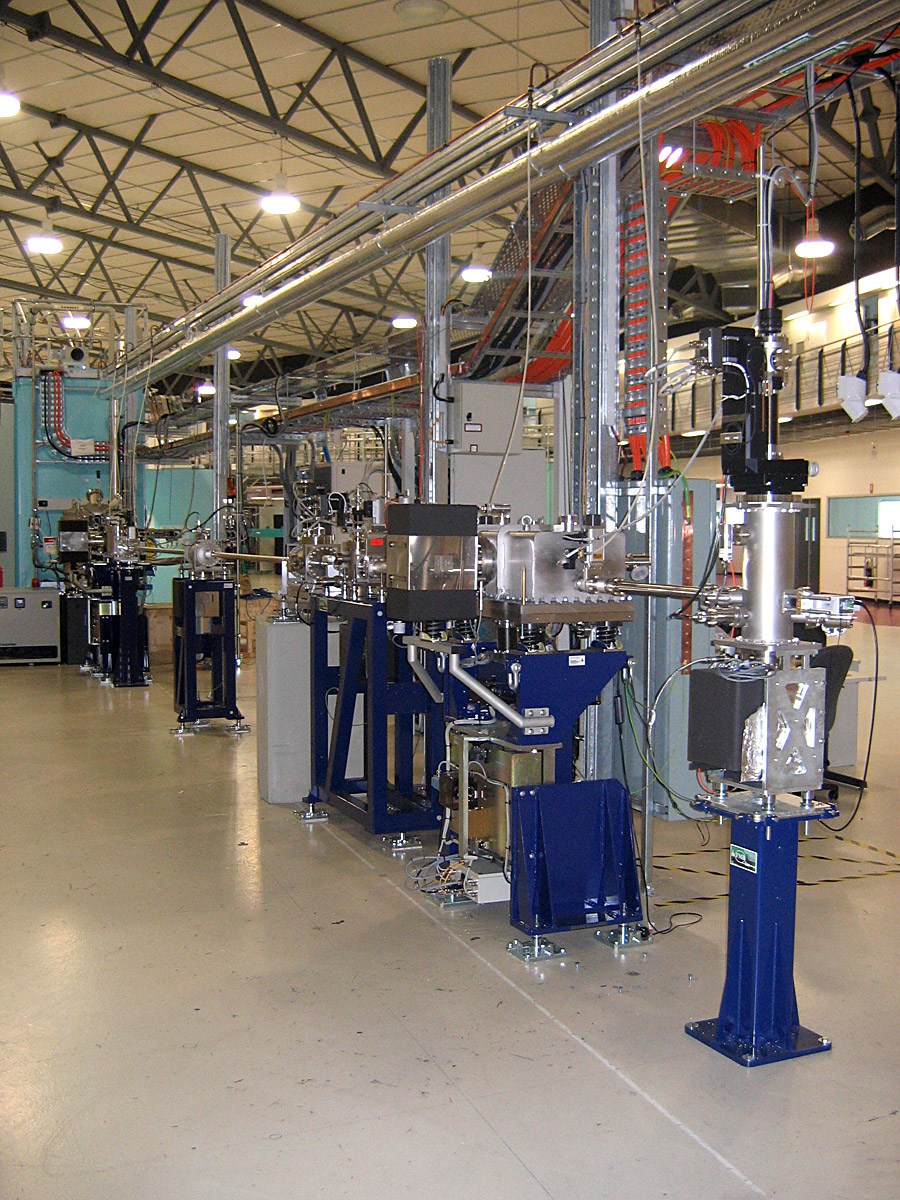
Soft x-ray beamline and endstation

- Imaging and Medical Beamline (IMBL)
- X-ray Fluorescence Microscopy (XFM) beamline
- Macromolecular and Micro crystallography (MX1 and MX2) beamlines (Protein crystallography)
- Infrared microscopy (IRM) beamline
- Soft X-ray Spectroscopy (SXR) beamline
- Small and Wide Angle X-ray Scattering (SAXS/WAXS) beamline
- X-ray Absorption Spectroscopy (XAS) beamline
- Powder diffraction (PD) beamline
- Micro Computed Tomography (MCT)
- Medium Energy X-ray Absorption Spectroscopy (MEX1 and MEX2)
- Biological Small Angle Scattering (BioSAXS)
- High Performance Macromolecular Crystallography (MX3)

Beamlines under construction (as of 2026)

- Advanced Diffraction and Scattering (ADS1 and ADS2)
- X-ray Fluorescence NanoProbe (Nano)

== See also ==
- List of synchrotron radiation facilities
