= Dipole magnet =

Simplest type of magnet

Magnetic field of a simple bar magnet

A dipole magnet is the simplest type of magnet. It has two poles, one north and one south. Its magnetic field lines form simple closed loops which emerge from the north pole, re-enter at the south pole, then pass through the body of the magnet. The simplest example of a dipole magnet is a bar magnet.

== Dipole magnets in accelerators ==
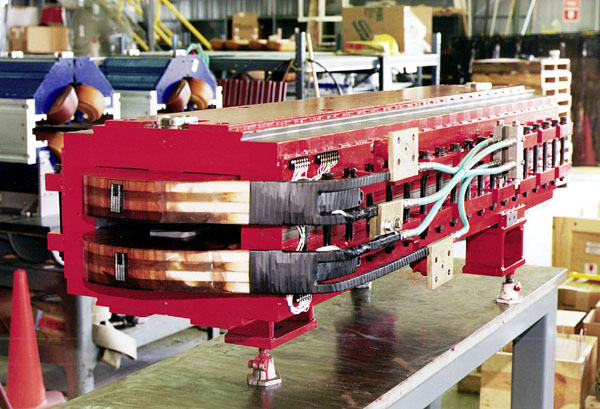
Dipole magnet from the Advanced Photon Source

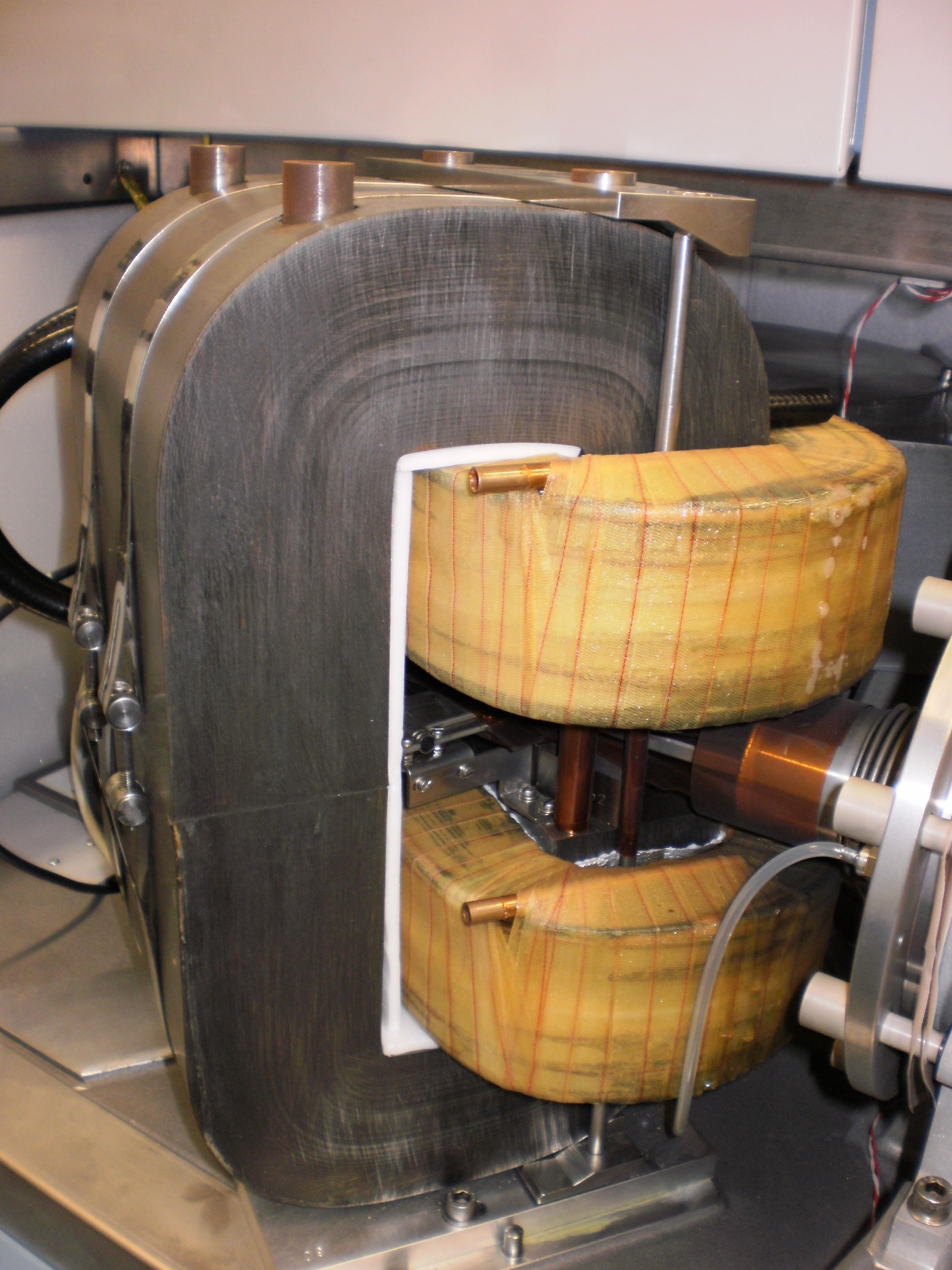
Dipole magnet of a plasma mass spectrometer

In particle accelerators, a dipole magnet is the electromagnet used to create a homogeneous magnetic field over some distance. Particle motion in that field will be circular in a plane that is perpendicular to the field and collinear to the direction of particle motion, and free in the direction orthogonal to it. Thus, a particle injected into a dipole magnet will travel on a circular or helical trajectory. By adding several dipole sections on the same plane, the bending radial effect of the beam increases.

In accelerator physics, dipole magnets are used to realize bends in the design trajectory (or 'orbit') of the particles, as in circular accelerators. Other uses include:

- Injection of particles into the accelerator
- Ejection of particles from the accelerator
- Correction of orbit errors
- Production of synchrotron radiation

The force on a charged particle in a particle accelerator from a dipole magnet can be described by the Lorentz force law, where a charged particle experiences a force of

$$\mathbf{F} = q\mathbf{E} + q\mathbf{v} \times \mathbf{B}$$

(in SI units). In the case of a particle accelerator dipole magnet, the charged particle beam is bent via the cross product of the particle's velocity and the magnetic field vector, with direction also being dependent on the charge of the particle.

The amount of force that can be applied to a charged particle by a dipole magnet is one of the limiting factors for modern synchrotron and cyclotron proton and ion accelerators. As the energy of the accelerated particles increases, they require more force to change direction and require larger B fields to be steered. Limitations on the amount of B field that can be produced with modern dipole electromagnets require synchrotrons/cyclotrons to increase in size (thus increasing the number of dipole magnets used) to compensate for increases in particle velocity. In the largest modern synchrotron, the Large Hadron Collider, there are 1232 main dipole magnets used for bending the path of the particle beam, each weighing 35 metric tons.

In modern particle accelerators, dipole magnets are powered by highly stable current-controlled power supplies, effectively operating as precision DC current generators. Since the magnetic field produced by an electromagnet is directly proportional to the current flowing through its coils, the stability and noise performance of the power supply are critical parameters. Typical requirements for synchrotron light sources and similar facilities demand long-term current stability better than 10 parts per million (ppm) over 8 to 24 hours, while accuracy is generally better than 100 ppm. Such stringent specifications ensure that the magnetic field remains sufficiently stable to preserve the beam trajectory and quality during accelerator operation.

== Other uses ==
Other uses of dipole magnets to deflect moving particles include isotope mass measurement in mass spectrometry, and particle momentum measurement in particle physics.

Such magnets are also used in traditional televisions, which contain a cathode-ray tube, which is essentially a small particle accelerator. Their magnets are called deflecting coils. The magnets move a single spot on the screen of the TV tube in a controlled way all over the screen.

Magnetic field of a cylindrical dipole magnet with a gap of near-constant field in the center. The same field configuration is obtained from two stacked current loops.

== See also ==
- Accelerator physics
- Beam line
- Cyclotron
- Electromagnetism
- Linear particle accelerator
- Particle accelerator
- Quadrupole magnet
- Sextupole magnet
- Multipole magnet
- Storage ring
