= Quadrupole magnet =

Group of four magnets

Four bar magnets configured to produce a quadrupole

Quadrupole magnets consist of a group of four magnets laid out so that in the planar multipole expansion of the field, the dipole terms cancel and where the lowest significant terms in the field equations are quadrupole. Quadrupole magnets are useful as they create a magnetic field whose magnitude grows rapidly with the radial distance from its longitudinal axis. This is used in particle beam focusing.

The simplest magnetic quadrupole is two identical bar magnets parallel to each other such that the north pole of one is next to the south of the other and vice versa. Such a configuration will have no dipole moment, and its field will decrease at large distances faster than that of a dipole. A stronger version with very little external field involves using a k=3 Halbach cylinder.

In some designs of quadrupoles using electromagnets, there are four steel pole tips: two opposing magnetic north poles and two opposing magnetic south poles. The steel is magnetized by an electric current in the coils of tubing wrapped around the poles. Another design is a Helmholtz coil layout but with the current in one of the coils reversed.

== Quadrupoles in particle accelerators ==
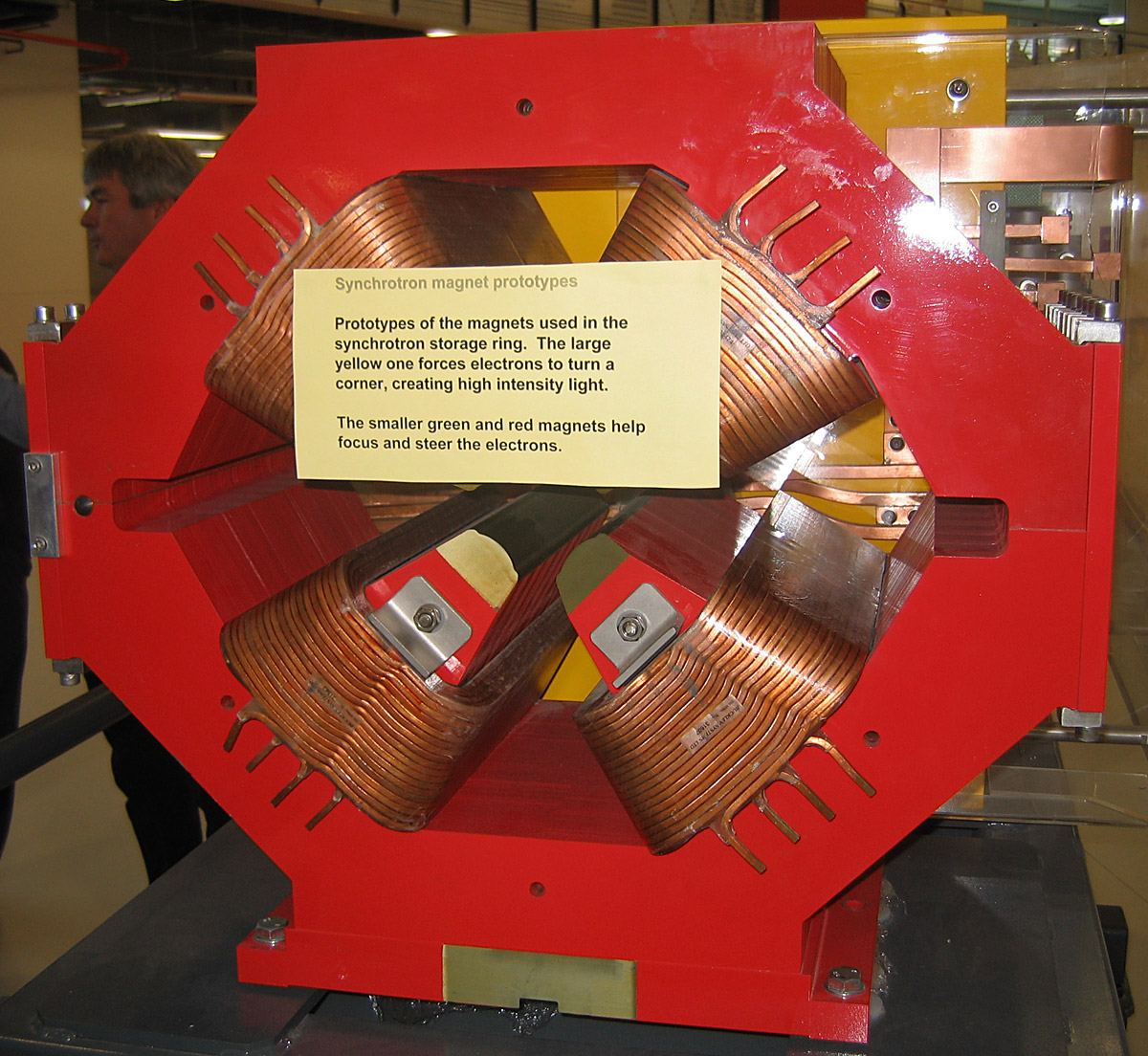
A quadrupole electromagnet as used in the storage ring of the Australian Synchrotron

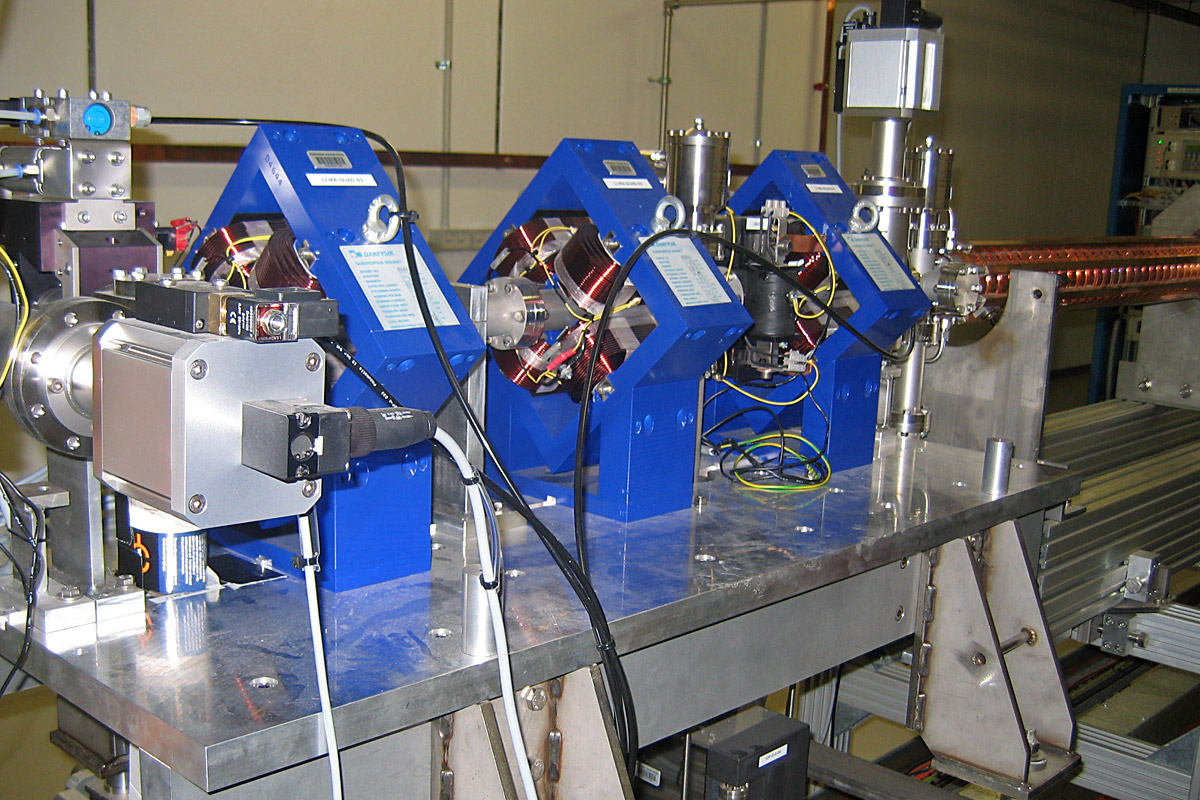
Quadrupole electromagnets (in blue), surrounding the linac of the Australian Synchrotron, are used to focus the electron beam

At the particle speeds reached in high energy particle accelerators, the magnetic force term is larger than the electric term in the Lorentz force:

$$\mathbf{F} = q (\mathbf{E} + \mathbf{v} \times \mathbf{B}),$$

and thus magnetic deflection is more effective than electrostatic deflection. Therefore a 'lattice' of electromagnets is used to bend, steer and focus a charged particle beam

The work done on a relativistic particle (=the energy needed) in order to keep it in a circular motion with a give radius is equal, regardless of the source of the centripetal force. There is nothing more efficient or effective in using B or E fields in creating circular motion, given setup corresponding to the properties of that field. There are 2 main reasons why particle accelarators are using B fields instead of E fields for radial deflection: 1. B fields always a force perpendicular to the direction of motion and therefore it is much easier to build a setup for circular motion using this type of field 2. In relativistic energies the Energy required to create this motion is so large, that when an E field is used, it causes vacuum-electrical breakdown of the materials used in the system. This doesn't happen with a B field precisely because the Lorentz force induced by it is proportional to the velocity - if a particle doesn't move fast enough, it won't experience a strong enough force to break down the material it is in, even though the same amount of energy would be used in order to produce the motion.

Calculation:

The force required for circular motion with radius r:

$F_r = \frac{\gamma m v^2}{r} = \frac{p v}{r}$

Compare with the Coulomb force or the electric component of the Lorentz force:

${pv \over r} = qE \Rightarrow r = {pv \over qE}$

Magnetic component:

${pv \over r} = qvB \Rightarrow r = {p \over qB}$

r = r:

${p \over qB} = {pv \over qE} \Rightarrow E = vB \sim cB$ (for relativistic particles)

Energy density for each field:

$u_E = 0.5 \times \epsilon_0 E^2$

$u_B = 0.5 B^2 / (\mu_0)$

Divide by each other and substitute E = cB:

${u_E \over u_B} = \epsilon_0 \mu_0 \times {E^2 \over B^2} \sim {1 \over c^2} \times c^2 = 1$

This means that a Lorentz force of the same magnitude (<=> circular motion with the same radius) requires the same amount of energy, regardless of whether it is generated by a magnetic field (B) or an electric field (E).

Magnetic field lines of an idealized quadrupole field in the plane transverse to the nominal beam direction. The red arrows show the direction of the magnetic field while the blue arrows indicate the direction of the Lorentz force on a positive particle going into the image plane (away from the reader)

The quadrupoles in the lattice are of two types: 'F quadrupoles' (which are horizontally focusing but vertically defocusing) and 'D quadrupoles' (which are vertically focusing but horizontally defocusing). This situation is due to the laws of electromagnetism (the Maxwell equations) which show that it is impossible for a quadrupole to focus in both planes at the same time. The image on the right shows an example of a quadrupole focusing in the vertical direction for a positively charged particle going into the image plane (forces above and below the center point towards the center) while defocusing in the horizontal direction (forces left and right of the center point away from the center).

If an F quadrupole and a D quadrupole are placed immediately next to each other, their fields completely cancel out (in accordance with Earnshaw's theorem). But if there is a space between them (and the length of this has been correctly chosen), the overall effect is focusing in both horizontal and vertical planes. A lattice can then be built up enabling the transport of the beam over long distances—for example round an entire ring. A common lattice is a FODO lattice consisting of a basis of a focusing quadrupole, 'nothing' (often a bending magnet), a defocusing quadrupole and another length of 'nothing'.

In modern particle accelerators, quadrupole magnets are powered by highly stable current-controlled power supplies, effectively operating as precision DC current generators. Since the magnetic field produced by an electromagnet is directly proportional to the current flowing through its coils, the stability and noise performance of the power supply are critical parameters. Typical requirements for synchrotron light sources and similar facilities demand long-term current stability better than 10 parts per million (ppm) over 8 to 24 hours, while accuracy is generally better than 100 ppm. Such stringent specifications ensure that the magnetic field remains sufficiently stable to preserve the beam trajectory and quality during accelerator operation.

== Equations of motion and focal length for charged particles ==
A charged particle beam in a quadrupole magnetic field will experience a focusing / defocusing force in the transverse direction. This focusing effect is summed up by a focusing strength $\kappa$ which depends on the quadrupole gradient $G$ as well as the beam's rigidity $[B\rho]=p/q$, where $q$ is the electric charge of the particle and

$$p = \gamma mv=\beta\gamma mc,\qquad \beta=\frac{v}{c},\quad\gamma=(1-\beta^2)^{-1/2}$$

is the relativistic momentum. The focusing strength is given by

$$\kappa = \frac{G}{[B\rho]}$$,

and particles in the magnetic will behave according to the ODE

$$x^{\prime\prime}(z) + \frac{\gamma^\prime(z)}{\gamma^2(z)\beta(z)}x^\prime(z) + \kappa(z)x(z)=0$$.

The same equation will be true for the y direction, but with a minus sign in front of the focusing strength to account for the field changing directions.

== Quadrupole ideal field ==
The components of the ideal magnetic field in the plane transverse to the beam are given by the following (see also multipole magnet).

$$\begin{align}
\vec{B}_{\text{normal}} & = \left(\begin{matrix} K\cdot y, & K\cdot x, & 0 \end{matrix}\right)\\
\vec{B}_{\text{skew}} & = \left(\begin{matrix} J\cdot x, & -J\cdot y, & 0 \end{matrix}\right)\\
\end{align}$$

where $K$ is the field gradient of the normal quadrupole component and $J$ is the field gradient of the skew quadrupole component. The SI unit of the field gradients are $\mathrm{T}/\mathrm{m}$. The field in a normal quadrupole is such that the magnetic poles are arranged with an angle of 45 degrees to the horizontal and vertical planes. The sign of $K$ determines whether (for a fixed particle charge and direction) the quadrupole focuses or defocuses particles in the horizontal plane.

== See also ==
- Charged particle beam
- Dipole magnet
- Electron optics
- Halbach cylinder
- Sextupole magnet
- Multipole magnet
- Accelerator physics
