= Linear particle accelerator =

Type of particle accelerator

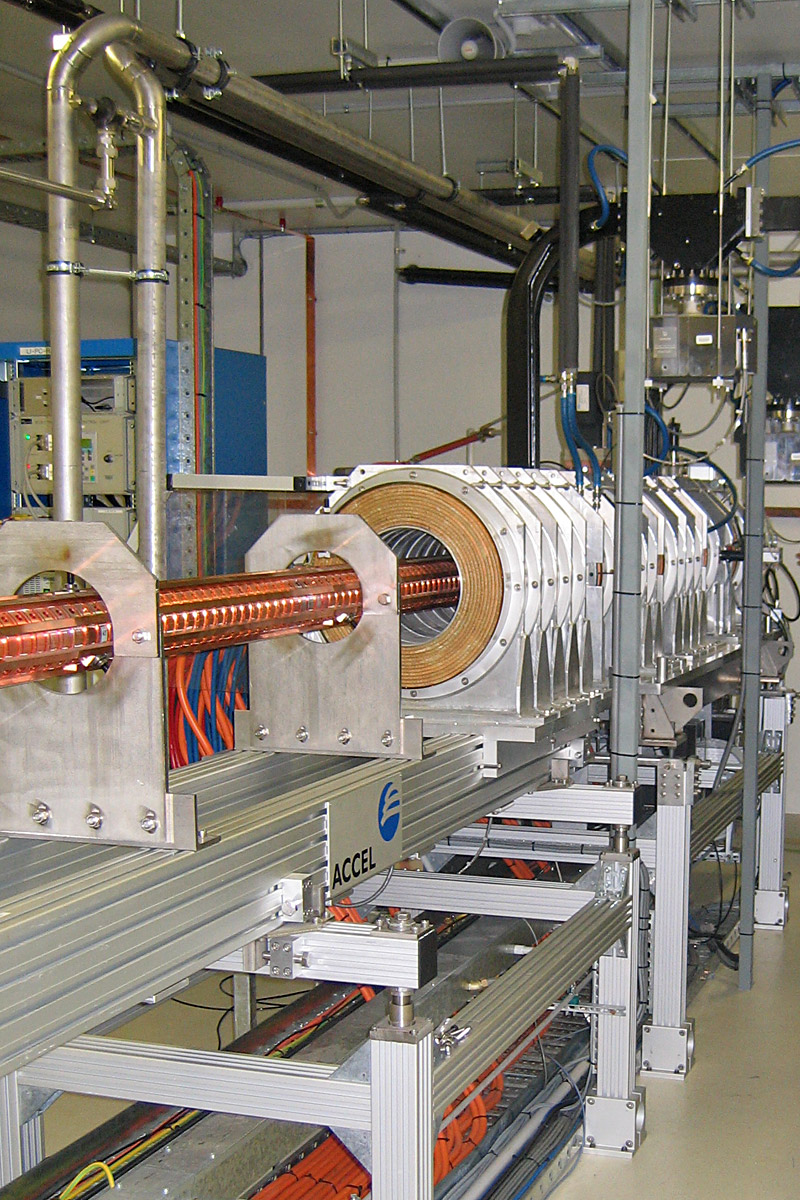
The linac within the Australian Synchrotron uses radio waves from a series of RF cavities at the start of the linac to accelerate the electron beam in bunches to energies of 100 MeV.

A linear particle accelerator (often shortened to linac) is a type of particle accelerator that accelerates charged subatomic particles or ions to a high speed by subjecting them to a series of oscillating electric potentials along a linear beamline. The principles for such machines were proposed by Gustav Ising in 1924, while the first machine that worked was constructed by Rolf Widerøe in 1928 at the RWTH Aachen University. Linacs have many applications: they generate X-rays and high energy electrons for medicinal purposes in radiation therapy, serve as particle injectors for higher-energy accelerators, and are used directly to achieve the highest kinetic energy for light particles (electrons and positrons) for particle physics.

The design of a linac depends on the type of particle that is being accelerated: electrons, protons or ions. Linacs range in size from a cathode-ray tube (which is a type of linac) to the 3.2-kilometre-long (2.0 mi) linac at the SLAC National Accelerator Laboratory in Menlo Park, California.

== History ==
Wideroe's linac concept. The voltage from an RF source is connected to a series of tubes which shield the particle between gaps.

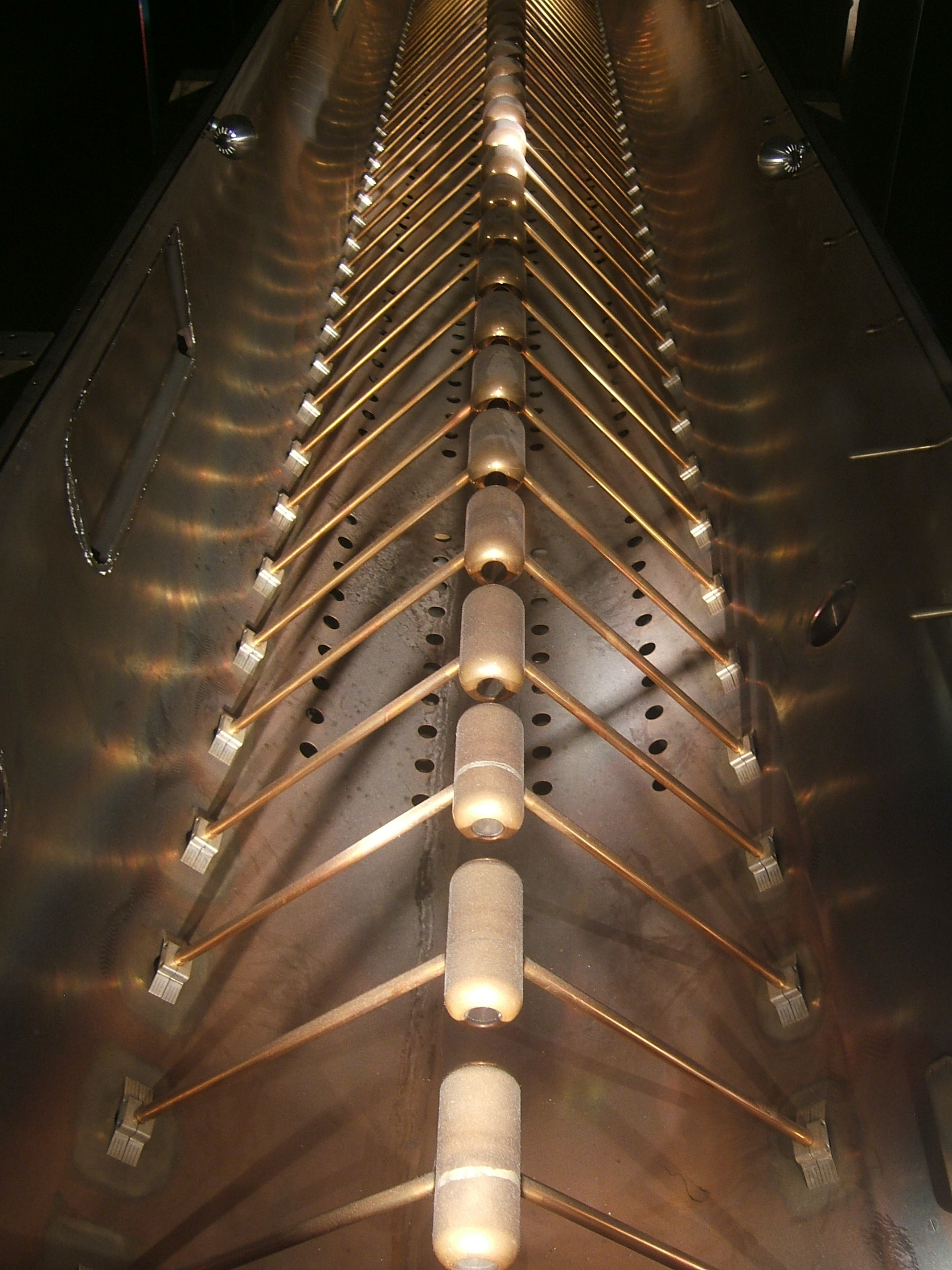
Alvarez type linac

In 1924, Gustav Ising published the first description of a linear particle accelerator using a series of accelerating gaps. Particles would proceed down a series of tubes. At a regular frequency, an accelerating voltage would be applied across each gap. As the particles gained speed while the frequency remained constant, the gaps would be spaced farther and farther apart, in order to ensure the particle would see a voltage applied as it reached each gap. Ising never successfully implemented this design.

Rolf Wideroe discovered Ising's paper in 1927, and as part of his PhD thesis he built an 88-inch long, two gap version of the device. Where Ising had proposed a spark gap as the voltage source, Wideroe used a 25kV vacuum tube oscillator. He successfully demonstrated that he had accelerated sodium and potassium ions to an energy of 50,000 electron volts (50 keV), twice the energy they would have received if accelerated only once by the tube. By successfully accelerating a particle multiple times using the same voltage source, Wideroe demonstrated the utility of radio frequency (RF) acceleration.

This type of linac was limited by the voltage sources that were available at the time, and it was not until after World War II that Luis Alvarez was able to use newly developed high frequency oscillators to design the first resonant cavity drift tube linac. An Alvarez linac differs from the Wideroe type in that the RF power is applied to the entire resonant chamber through which the particle travels, and the central tubes are only used to shield the particles during the decelerating portion of the oscillator's phase. Using this approach to acceleration meant that Alvarez's first linac was able to achieve proton energies of 31.5 MeV in 1947, the highest that had ever been reached at the time.

The initial Alvarez type linacs had no strong mechanism for keeping the beam focused and were limited in length and energy as a result. The development of the strong focusing principle in the early 1950s led to the installation of focusing quadrupole magnets inside the drift tubes, allowing for longer and thus more powerful linacs. Two of the earliest examples of Alvarez linacs with strong focusing magnets were built at CERN and Brookhaven National Laboratory.

In 1947, at about the same time that Alvarez was developing his linac concept for protons, William Hansen constructed the first travelling-wave electron accelerator at Stanford University. Electrons are sufficiently lighter than protons that they achieve speeds close to the speed of light early in the acceleration process. As a result, "accelerating" electrons increase in energy but can be treated as having a constant velocity from an accelerator design standpoint. This allowed Hansen to use an accelerating structure consisting of a horizontal waveguide loaded by a series of discs. The 1947 accelerator had an energy of 6 MeV. Over time, electron acceleration at the SLAC National Accelerator Laboratory would extend to a size of 2 miles (3.2 km) and an output energy of 50 GeV.

As linear accelerators were developed with higher beam currents, using magnetic fields to focus proton and heavy ion beams presented difficulties for the initial stages of the accelerator. Because the magnetic force is dependent on the particle velocity, it was desirable to create a type of accelerator which could simultaneously accelerate and focus low-to-mid energy hadrons. In 1970, Soviet physicists I. M. Kapchinsky and Vladimir Teplyakov proposed the radio-frequency quadrupole (RFQ) type of accelerating structure. RFQs use vanes or rods with precisely designed shapes in a resonant cavity to produce complex electric fields. These fields provide simultaneous acceleration and focusing to injected particle beams.

Beginning in the 1960s, scientists at Stanford and elsewhere began to explore the use of superconducting radio frequency cavities for particle acceleration. Superconducting cavities made of niobium alloys allow for much more efficient acceleration, as a substantially higher fraction of the input power could be applied to the beam rather than lost to heat. Some of the earliest superconducting linacs included the Superconducting Linear Accelerator (for electrons) at Stanford and the Argonne Tandem Linear Accelerator System (for protons and heavy ions) at Argonne National Laboratory.

== Basic principles of operation ==
Animation showing how a linear accelerator works. In this example the particles accelerated (red dots) are assumed to have a positive charge. The graph V(x) shows the electrical potential along the axis of the accelerator at each point in time. The polarity of the RF voltage reverses as the particle passes through each electrode, so when the particle crosses each gap the electric field (E, arrows) has the correct direction to accelerate it. The animation shows a single particle being accelerated each cycle; in actual linacs a large number of particles are injected and accelerated each cycle. The action is shown slowed enormously.

=== Radiofrequency acceleration ===
When a charged particle is placed in an electromagnetic field it experiences a force given by the Lorentz force law:

$$\vec{F} = q \vec{E} + q \vec{v} \times \vec{B}$$

where $q$ is the charge on the particle, $\vec{E}$ is the electric field, $\vec{v}$ is the particle velocity, and $\vec{B}$ is the magnetic field. The cross product in the magnetic field term means that static magnetic fields cannot be used for particle acceleration, as the magnetic force acts perpendicularly to the direction of particle motion.

As electrostatic breakdown limits the maximum constant voltage which can be applied across a gap to produce an electric field, most accelerators use some form of RF acceleration. In RF acceleration, the particle traverses a series of accelerating regions, driven by a source of voltage in such a way that the particle sees an accelerating field as it crosses each region. In this type of acceleration, particles must necessarily travel in "bunches" corresponding to the portion of the oscillator's cycle where the electric field is pointing in the intended direction of acceleration.

If a single oscillating voltage source is used to drive a series of gaps, those gaps must be placed increasingly far apart as the speed of the particle increases. This is to ensure that the particle "sees" the same phase of the oscillator's cycle as it reaches each gap. As particles asymptotically approach the speed of light, the gap separation becomes constant: additional applied force increases the energy of the particles but does not significantly alter their speed.

=== Focusing ===
In order to ensure particles do not escape the accelerator, it is necessary to provide some form of focusing to redirect particles moving away from the central trajectory back towards the intended path. With the discovery of strong focusing, quadrupole magnets are used to actively redirect particles moving away from the reference path. As quadrupole magnets are focusing in one transverse direction and defocusing in the perpendicular direction, it is necessary to use groups of magnets to provide an overall focusing effect in both directions.

==== Phase stability ====
Focusing along the direction of travel, also known as phase stability, is an inherent property of RF acceleration. If the particles in a bunch all reach the accelerating region during the rising phase of the oscillating field, then particles which arrive early will see slightly less voltage than the "reference" particle at the center of the bunch. Those particles will therefore receive slightly less acceleration and eventually fall behind the reference particle. Correspondingly, particles which arrive after the reference particle will receive slightly more acceleration, and will catch up to the reference as a result. This automatic correction occurs at each accelerating gap, so the bunch is refocused along the direction of travel each time it is accelerated.

== Construction and operation ==
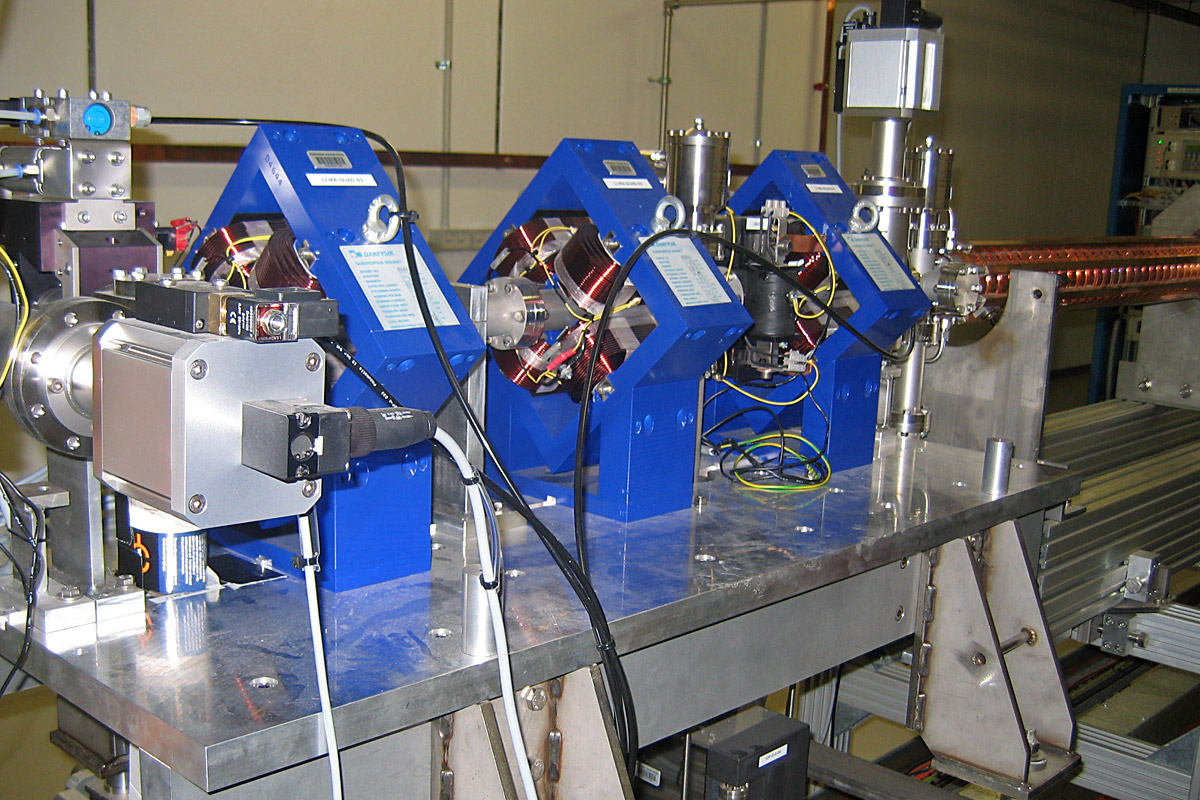
Quadrupole magnets surrounding the linac of the Australian Synchrotron are used to help focus the electron beam

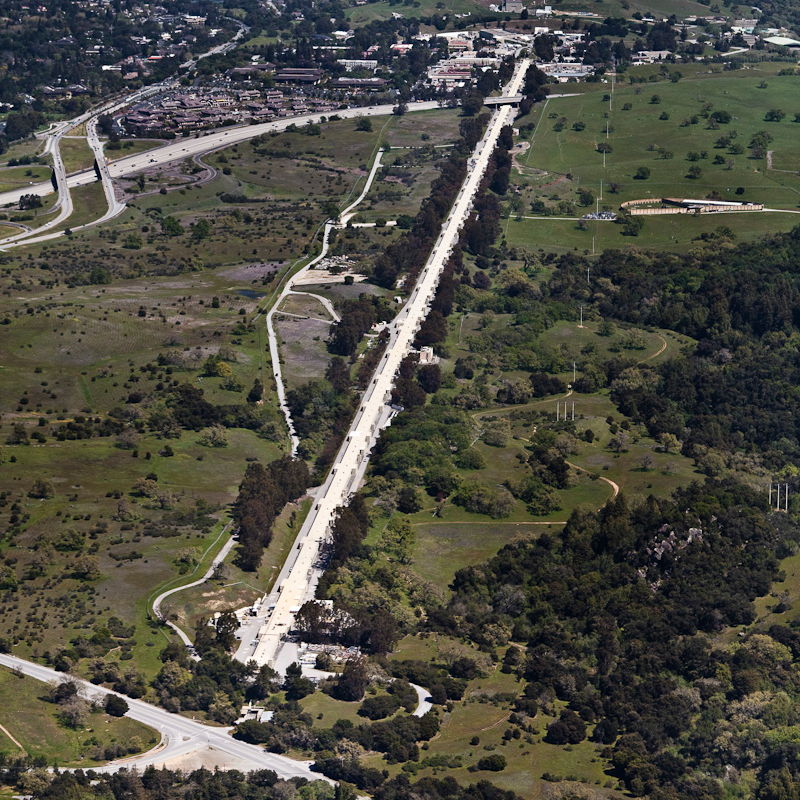
Building covering the 2 mile (3.2 km) beam tube of the Stanford Linear Accelerator (SLAC) at Menlo Park, California, the second most powerful linac in the world. It has about 80,000 accelerating electrodes and could accelerate electrons to 50 GeV

A linear particle accelerator consists of the following parts:

- A straight hollow pipe vacuum chamber which contains the other components. It is evacuated with a vacuum pump so that the accelerated particles will not collide with air molecules. The length will vary with the application. If the device is used for the production of X-rays for inspection or therapy, then the pipe may be only 0.5 to 1.5 meters long. If the device is to be an injector for a synchrotron, it may be about ten meters long. If the device is used as the primary accelerator for nuclear particle investigations, it may be several thousand meters long.
- The particle source (S) at one end of the chamber which produces the charged particles which the machine accelerates. The design of the source depends on the particle that is being accelerated. Electrons are generated by a cold cathode, a hot cathode, a photocathode, or radio frequency ion sources. Protons are generated in an ion source, which can have many different designs. If heavier particles are to be accelerated, (e.g., uranium ions), a specialized ion source is needed. The source has its own high voltage supply to inject the particles into the beamline.
- Extending along the pipe from the source is a series of open-ended cylindrical electrodes (C1, C2, C3, C4), whose length increases progressively with the distance from the source. The particles from the source pass through these electrodes. The length of each electrode is determined by the frequency and power of the driving power source and the particle to be accelerated, so that the particle passes through each electrode in exactly one-half cycle of the accelerating voltage. The mass of the particle has a large effect on the length of the cylindrical electrodes; for example an electron is considerably lighter than a proton and so will generally require a much smaller section of cylindrical electrodes as it accelerates very quickly.
- A target with which the particles collide, located at the end of the accelerating electrodes. If electrons are accelerated to produce X-rays, then a water-cooled tungsten target is used. Various target materials are used when protons or other nuclei are accelerated, depending upon the specific investigation. Behind the target are various detectors to detect the particles resulting from the collision of the incoming particles with the atoms of the target. Many linacs serve as the initial accelerator stage for larger particle accelerators such as synchrotrons and storage rings, and in this case after leaving the electrodes the accelerated particles enter the next stage of the accelerator.
- An electronic oscillator and amplifier (G) which generates a radio frequency AC voltage of high potential (usually thousands of volts) which is applied to the cylindrical electrodes. This is the accelerating voltage which produces the electric field which accelerates the particles. Opposite phase voltage is applied to successive electrodes. A high power accelerator will have a separate amplifier to power each electrode, all synchronized to the same frequency.

As shown in the animation, the oscillating voltage applied to alternate cylindrical electrodes has opposite polarity (180° out of phase), so adjacent electrodes have opposite voltages. This creates an oscillating electric field (E) in the gap between each pair of electrodes, which exerts force on the particles when they pass through, imparting energy to them by accelerating them. The particle source injects a group of particles into the first electrode once each cycle of the voltage, when the charge on the electrode is opposite to the charge on the particles. Each time the particle bunch passes through an electrode, the oscillating voltage changes polarity, so when the particles reach the gap between electrodes the electric field is in the correct direction to accelerate them. Therefore, the particles accelerate to a faster speed each time they pass between electrodes; there is little electric field inside the electrodes so the particles travel at a constant speed within each electrode.

The particles are injected at the right time so that the oscillating voltage differential between electrodes is maximum as the particles cross each gap. If the peak voltage applied between the electrodes is $V_p$ volts, and the charge on each particle is $q$ elementary charges, the particle gains an equal increment of energy of $qV_p$ electron volts when passing through each gap. Thus the output energy of the particles is

$$E = qNV_p$$

electron volts, where $N$ is the number of accelerating electrodes in the machine.

At speeds near the speed of light, the incremental velocity increase will be small, with the energy appearing as an increase in the mass of the particles. In portions of the accelerator where this occurs, the tubular electrode lengths will be almost constant. Additional magnetic or electrostatic lens elements may be included to ensure that the beam remains in the center of the pipe and its electrodes. Very long accelerators may maintain a precise alignment of their components through the use of servo systems guided by a laser beam.

== Concepts in development ==
Various new concepts are in development as of 2021. The primary goal is to make linear accelerators cheaper, with better focused beams, higher energy or higher beam current.

=== Induction linear accelerator ===
Induction linear accelerators use the electric field induced by a time-varying magnetic field for acceleration—like the betatron. The particle beam passes through a series of ring-shaped ferrite cores standing one behind the other, which are magnetized by high-current pulses, and in turn each generate an electrical field strength pulse along the axis of the beam direction. Induction linear accelerators are considered for short high current pulses from electrons but also from heavy ions. The concept goes back to the work of Nicholas Christofilos. Its realization is highly dependent on progress in the development of more suitable ferrite materials. With electrons, pulse currents of up to 5 kiloamps at energies up to 5 MeV and pulse durations in the range of 20 to 300 nanoseconds were achieved.

=== Energy recovery linac ===
In previous electron linear accelerators, the accelerated particles are used only once and then fed into an absorber (beam dump), in which their residual energy is converted into heat. In an energy recovery linac (ERL), the accelerated in resonators and, for example, in undulators. The electrons used are fed back through the accelerator, out of phase by 180 degrees. They therefore pass through the resonators in the decelerating phase and thus return their remaining energy to the field. The concept is comparable to the hybrid drive of motor vehicles, where the kinetic energy released during braking is made available for the next acceleration by charging a battery.

The Brookhaven National Laboratory and the Helmholtz-Zentrum Berlin with the project "bERLinPro" reported on corresponding development work. The Berlin experimental accelerator uses superconducting niobium cavity resonators. In 2014, three free-electron lasers based on ERLs were in operation worldwide: in the Jefferson Lab (US), in the Budker Institute of Nuclear Physics (Russia) and at JAEA (Japan). At the University of Mainz, an ERL called MESA is expected to begin operation in 2024.

=== Compact Linear Collider ===
The concept of the Compact Linear Collider (CLIC) (original name CERN Linear Collider, with the same abbreviation) for electrons and positrons provides a traveling wave accelerator for energies of the order of 1 tera-electron volt (TeV). Instead of the otherwise necessary numerous klystron amplifiers to generate the acceleration power, a second parallel electron linear accelerator of lower energy is to be used, which works with superconducting cavities in which standing waves are formed. High-frequency power is extracted from it at regular intervals and transmitted to the main accelerator. In this way, the very high acceleration field strength of 80 MV / m should be achieved.

=== Kielfeld accelerator (plasma accelerator) ===
In cavity resonators, the dielectric strength limits the maximum acceleration that can be achieved within a certain distance. This limit can be circumvented using accelerated waves in plasma to generate the accelerating field in Kielfeld accelerators: A laser or particle beam excites an oscillation in a plasma, which is associated with very strong electric field strengths. This means that significantly (factors of 100s to 1000s ) more compact linear accelerators can possibly be built. Experiments involving high power lasers in metal vapour plasmas suggest that a beam line length reduction from some tens of metres to a few cm is quite possible.

== Modern concepts ==
The higher the frequency of the acceleration voltage selected, the more individual acceleration thrusts per path length a particle of a given speed experiences, and the shorter the accelerator can therefore be overall. That is why accelerator technology developed in the pursuit of higher particle energies, especially towards higher frequencies.

The linear accelerator concepts (often called accelerator structures in technical terms) that have been used since around 1950 work with frequencies in the range from around 100 MHz to a few gigahertz (GHz) and use the electric field component of electromagnetic waves.

=== Standing waves and traveling waves ===
When it comes to energies of more than a few MeV, accelerators for ions are different from those for electrons. The reason for this is the large mass difference between the particles. Electrons are already close to the speed of light, the absolute speed limit, at a few MeV; with further acceleration, as described by relativistic mechanics, almost only their energy and momentum increase. On the other hand, with ions of this energy range, the speed also increases significantly due to further acceleration.

The acceleration concepts used today for ions are always based on electromagnetic standing waves that are formed in suitable resonators. Depending on the type of particle, energy range and other parameters, very different types of resonators are used; the following sections only cover some of them. Electrons can also be accelerated with standing waves above a few MeV. An advantageous alternative here, however, is a progressive wave, a traveling wave. The phase velocity the traveling wave must be roughly equal to the particle speed. Therefore, this technique is only suitable when the particles are almost at the speed of light, so that their speed only increases very little.

The development of high-frequency oscillators and power amplifiers from the 1940s, especially the klystron, was essential for these two acceleration techniques . The first larger linear accelerator with standing waves - for protons - was built in 1945/46 in the Lawrence Berkeley National Laboratory under the direction of Luis W. Alvarez. The frequency used was 200 MHz. The first electron accelerator with traveling waves of around 2 GHz was developed a little later at Stanford University by W.W. Hansen and colleagues.

Principle of the acceleration of particle packets
by a standing wave	by a traveling wave

In the two diagrams, the curve and arrows indicate the force acting on the particles. Only at the points with the correct direction of the electric field vector, i.e. the correct direction of force, can particles absorb energy from the wave. (An increase in speed cannot be seen in the scale of these images.)

== Advantages ==
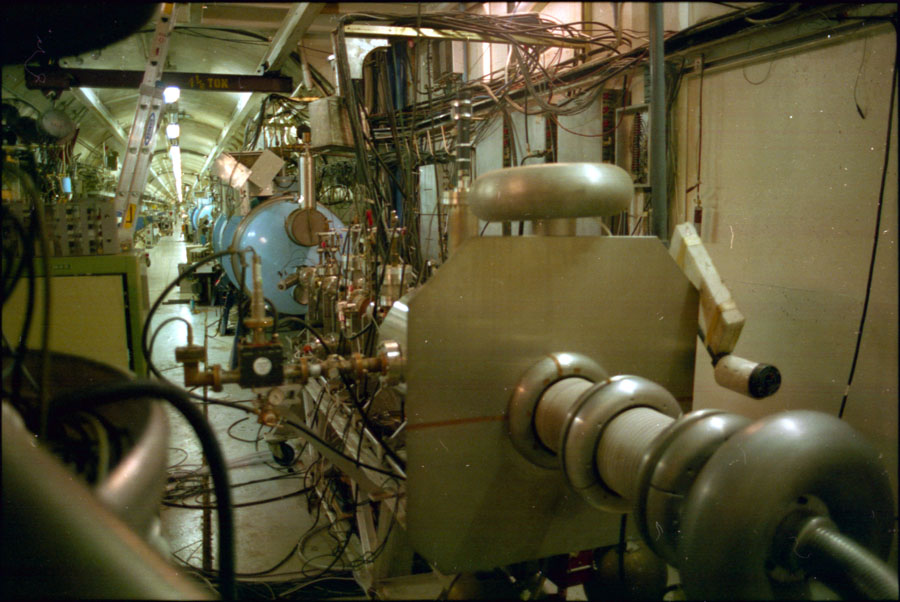
The Stanford University superconducting linear accelerator, housed on campus below the Hansen Labs until 2007. This facility is separate from SLAC

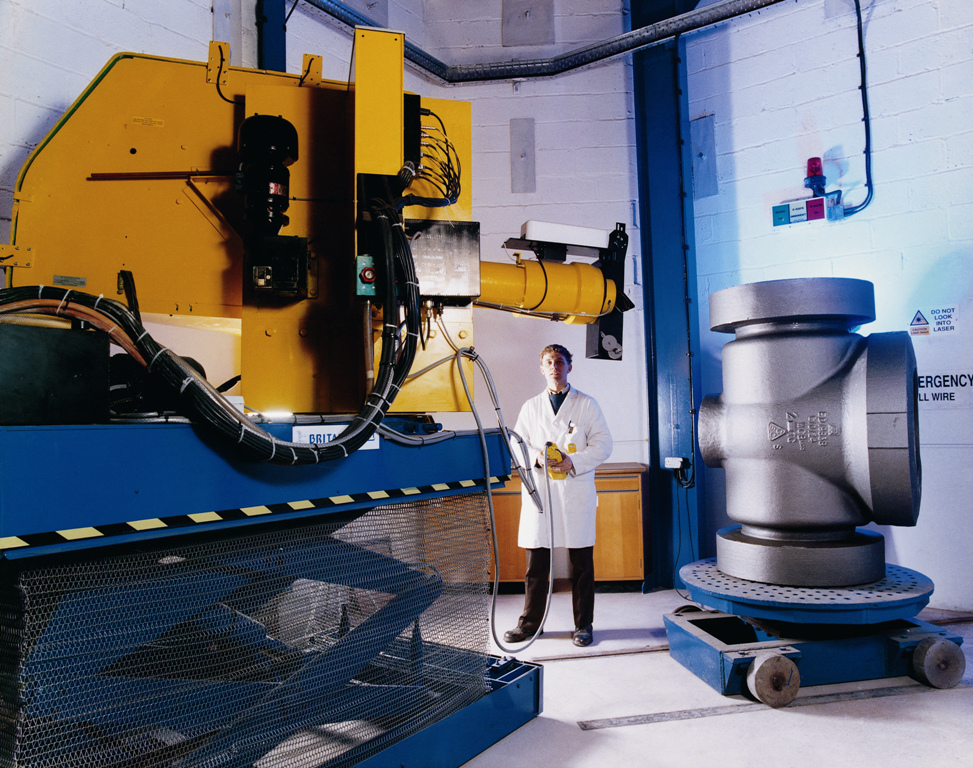
Steel casting undergoing x-ray using the linear accelerator at Goodwin Steel Castings Ltd

The linear accelerator could produce higher particle energies than the previous electrostatic particle accelerators (the Cockcroft–Walton accelerator and Van de Graaff generator) that were in use when it was invented. In these machines, the particles were only accelerated once by the applied voltage, so the particle energy in electron volts was equal to the accelerating voltage on the machine, which was limited to a few million volts by insulation breakdown. In the linac, the particles are accelerated multiple times by the applied voltage, so the particle energy is not limited by the accelerating voltage.

High power linacs are also being developed for production of electrons at relativistic speeds, required since fast electrons traveling in an arc will lose energy through synchrotron radiation; this limits the maximum power that can be imparted to electrons in a synchrotron of given size. Linacs are also capable of prodigious output, producing a nearly continuous stream of particles, whereas a synchrotron will only periodically raise the particles to sufficient energy to merit a "shot" at the target. (The burst can be held or stored in the ring at energy to give the experimental electronics time to work, but the average output current is still limited.) The high density of the output makes the linac particularly attractive for use in loading storage ring facilities with particles in preparation for particle to particle collisions. The high mass output also makes the device practical for the production of antimatter particles, which are generally difficult to obtain, being only a small fraction of a target's collision products. These may then be stored and further used to study matter-antimatter annihilation.

=== Medical linacs ===
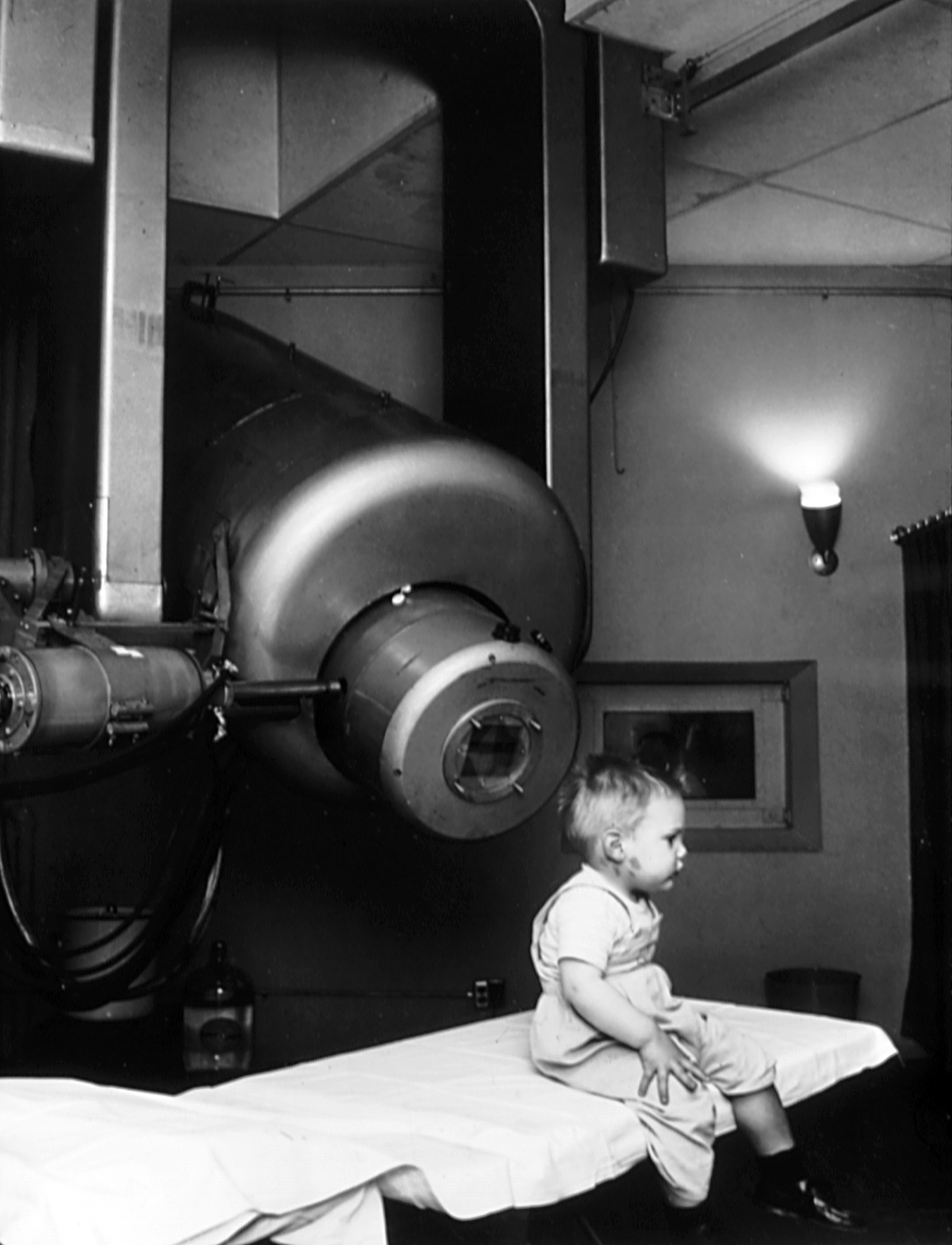
Historical image showing Gordon Isaacs, the first patient treated for retinoblastoma with linear accelerator radiation therapy (in this case an electron beam), in 1957, in the U.S. Other patients had been treated by linac for other diseases since 1953 in the UK. Gordon's right eye was removed on January 11, 1957 because cancer had spread there. His left eye, however, had only a localized tumor that prompted Henry Kaplan to treat it with the electron beam.

Linac-based radiation therapy for cancer treatment began with the first patient treated in 1953 in London, UK, at the Hammersmith Hospital, with an 8 MV machine built by Metropolitan-Vickers and installed in 1952, as the first dedicated medical linac. A short while later in 1954, a 6 MV linac was installed in Stanford, USA, which began treatments in 1956.

Medical linear accelerators accelerate electrons using a tuned-cavity waveguide, in which the RF power creates a standing wave. Some linacs have short, vertically mounted waveguides, while higher energy machines tend to have a horizontal, longer waveguide and a bending magnet to turn the beam vertically towards the patient. Medical linacs use monoenergetic electron beams between 4 and 25 MeV, giving an X-ray output with a spectrum of energies up to and including the electron energy when the electrons are directed at a high-density (such as tungsten) target. The electrons or X-rays can be used to treat both benign and malignant disease. The LINAC produces a reliable, flexible and accurate radiation beam. The versatility of LINAC is a potential advantage over cobalt therapy as a treatment tool. In addition, the device can simply be powered off when not in use; there is no source requiring heavy shielding – although the treatment room itself requires considerable shielding of the walls, doors, ceiling etc. to prevent escape of scattered radiation. Prolonged use of high powered (>18 MeV) machines can induce a significant amount of radiation within the metal parts of the head of the machine after power to the machine has been removed (i.e. they become an active source and the necessary precautions must be observed).

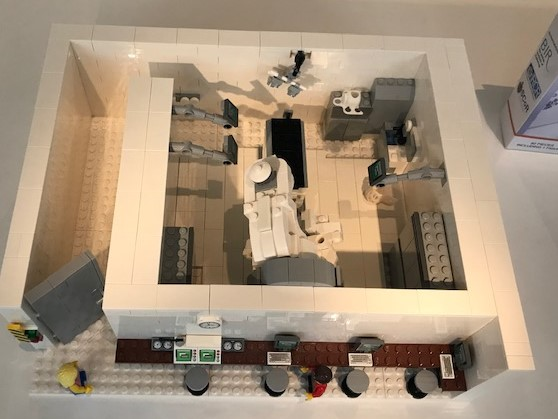
Aerial view of the Little LINAC Model

In 2019 a Little Linac model kit, containing 82 building blocks, was developed for children undergoing radiotherapy treatment for cancer. The hope is that building the model will alleviate some of the stress experienced by the child before undergoing treatment by helping them to understand what the treatment entails. The kit was developed by Professor David Brettle, Institute of Physics and Engineering in Medicine (IPEM) in collaboration with manufacturers Best-Lock Ltd. The model can be seen at the Science Museum, London.

An MR-LINAC is a medical linac integrated with a Magnetic resonance imaging scanner, which allows for real-time imaging during treatment, as well as patient motion management, and on-table adaptive planning.

== Application for medical isotope development ==
The expected shortages of Mo-99, and the technetium-99m medical isotope obtained from it, have also shed light onto linear accelerator technology to produce Mo-99 from non-enriched uranium through neutron bombardment. This would enable the medical isotope industry to manufacture this crucial isotope by a sub-critical process. The aging facilities, for example the Chalk River Laboratories in Ontario, Canada, which still now produce most Mo-99 from highly enriched uranium could be replaced by this new process. In this way, the sub-critical loading of soluble uranium salts in heavy water with subsequent photo neutron bombardment and extraction of the target product, Mo-99, will be achieved.

== Disadvantages ==
- The device length limits the locations where one may be placed.
- A great number of driver devices and their associated power supplies are required, increasing the construction and maintenance expense of this portion.
- If the walls of the accelerating cavities are made of normally conducting material and the accelerating fields are large, the wall resistivity converts electric energy into heat quickly.
- Superconductors need constant cooling to keep them below their critical temperature, and their accelerating fields are limited by quenches.
- Due to these limitations, high energy accelerators such as SLAC, still the longest in the world (in its various generations), are run in short pulses, limiting the average current output and forcing the experimental detectors to handle data coming in short bursts.

== See also ==
- Accelerator physics
- Beamline
- Compact Linear Collider
- Dielectric wall accelerator
- Duoplasmatron
- International Linear Collider
- Particle accelerator
- Particle beam
- SLAC National Accelerator Laboratory
