= Particle beam =

Stream of charged, or less frequently neutral particles

A particle beam is a stream of charged or neutral particles other than photons. In particle accelerators, these particles can move with a velocity close to the speed of light. There is a difference between the creation and control of charged particle beams and neutral particle beams, as only the first type can be manipulated to a sufficient extent by devices based on electromagnetism. The manipulation and diagnostics of charged particle beams at high kinetic energies using particle accelerators are main topics of accelerator physics.

== Sources ==
Charged particles such as electrons, positrons, and protons may be separated from their common surroundings. This can be accomplished by processes such as thermionic emission or arc discharge. The following devices are commonly used as sources for particle beams:

- Ion source
- Cathode-ray tube, or more specifically in one of its parts called electron gun. This is also part of traditional television and computer screens.
- Photocathodes may also be built in as a part of an electron gun, using the photoelectric effect to separate particles from their substrate.
- Neutron beams may be created by energetic proton beams which impact on a target, e.g. of beryllium material. (see article Particle therapy)

== Manipulation ==
=== Acceleration ===
Charged beams may be further accelerated by use of high resonant, sometimes also superconducting, microwave cavities. These devices accelerate particles by interaction with an electromagnetic field. Since the wavelength of hollow macroscopic, conducting devices is in the radio frequency (RF) band, the design of such cavities and other RF devices is also a part of accelerator physics.

More recently, plasma acceleration has emerged as a possibility to accelerate particles in a plasma medium, using the electromagnetic energy of pulsed high-power laser systems or the kinetic energy of other charged particles. This technique is under active development, but cannot provide reliable beams of sufficient quality at present.

=== Guidance ===
In all cases, the beam is steered with dipole magnets and focused with quadrupole magnets. With the end goal of reaching the desired position and beam spot size in the experiment.

== Applications ==
=== High-energy physics ===
High-energy particle beams are used for particle physics experiments in large facilities; the most common examples being the Large Hadron Collider and the Tevatron.

=== Synchrotron radiation ===
Electron beams are employed in synchrotron light sources to produce X-ray radiation with a continuous spectrum over a wide frequency band which is called synchrotron radiation. This X-ray radiation is used at beamlines of the synchrotron light sources for a variety of spectroscopies (XAS, XANES, EXAFS, μ-XRF, μ-XRD) in order to probe and to characterize the structure and the chemical speciation of solids and biological materials.

=== Particle therapy ===
Energetic particle beams consisting of protons, neutrons, or positive ions (also called particle microbeams) may also be used for cancer treatment in particle therapy.

Linear accelerators generate MeV electron beams, which can be used to treat surface cancers in patients. A tungsten/molybdenum target can also be moved into the beam to generate x-rays to treat deeper cancers.

=== Astrophysics and space physics ===
Many phenomena in astrophysics are attributed to particle beams of various kinds. Solar Type III radio bursts, the most common impulsive radio signatures from the Sun, are used by scientists as a tool to better understand solar accelerated electron beams. Additionally, particle beams cause instabilities when interacting with plasma, which may lead to conditions causing electrostatic solitary waves.

=== Military ===
The U.S. Advanced Research Projects Agency started work on particle beam weapons in 1958. The general idea of such weaponry is to hit a target object with a stream of accelerated particles with high kinetic energy, which is then transferred to the atoms, or molecules, of the target. The power needed to project a high-powered beam of this kind surpasses the production capabilities of any standard battlefield powerplant, thus such weapons are not anticipated to be produced in the foreseeable future.

== See also ==
- Electron beam
- Ion beam
- Astrophysical jet
- Atomic beam
- Accelerator neutrino
