= Magnetic radiation reaction force =

Force on an electromagnet when its magnetic moment changes

The magnetic radiation reaction force is a force on an electromagnet when its magnetic moment changes. One can derive an electric radiation reaction force for an accelerating charged particle caused by the particle emitting electromagnetic radiation. Likewise, a magnetic radiation reaction force can be derived for an accelerating magnetic moment emitting electromagnetic radiation.

Similar to the electric radiation reaction force, three conditions must be met in order to derive the following formula for the magnetic radiation reaction force. First, the motion of the magnetic moment must be periodic, an assumption used to derive the force. Second, the magnetic moment is traveling at non-relativistic velocities (that is, much slower than the speed of light). Finally, this only applies this force is proportional to the fifth derivative of the position as a function of time ("crackle"). Unlike the Abraham–Lorentz force, the force points in the direction opposite of the crackle.

== Definition and description ==
Mathematically, the magnetic radiation reaction force is given by, in SI units:
$$\mathbf{F}_\mathrm{rad} = -\frac{\mu_0 q^2 R}{24 \pi c^3} \frac {\mathrm{d}^3 \vec a} {\mathrm{d}t^3}$$
where:

- F is the force,
- $\frac {\mathrm{d}^3 \vec a} {\mathrm{d}t^3}$ is the crackle (the third derivative of acceleration, or the fifth derivative of displacement),
- μ_{0} is the permeability of free space,
- c is the speed of light in free space
- q is the electric charge of the particle.
- R is the radius of the magnetic moment

Note that this formula applies only for non-relativistic velocities.

Physically, a time changing magnetic moment emits radiation similar to the Larmor formula of an accelerating charge. Since momentum is conserved, the magnetic moment is pushed in the direction opposite the direction of the emitted radiation. In fact the formula above for radiation force can be derived from the magnetic version of the Larmor formula, as shown below.

== Background ==
In classical electrodynamics, problems are typically divided into two classes:

1. Problems in which the charge and current sources of fields are specified and the fields are calculated, and
2. The reverse situation, problems in which the fields are specified and the motion of particles are calculated.

In some fields of physics, such as plasma physics and the calculation of transport coefficients (conductivity, diffusivity, etc.), the fields generated by the sources and the motion of the sources are solved self-consistently. In such cases, however, the motion of a selected source is calculated in response to fields generated by all other sources. Rarely is the motion of a particle (source) due to the fields generated by that same particle calculated. The reason for this is twofold:

1. Neglect of the "self-fields" usually leads to answers that are accurate enough for many applications, and
2. Inclusion of self-fields leads to problems in physics such as renormalization, some of which still unsolved, that relate to the very nature of matter and energy.

This conceptual problems created by self-fields are highlighted in a standard graduate text. [Jackson]

The difficulties presented by this problem touch one of the most fundamental aspects of physics, the nature of the elementary particle. Although partial solutions, workable within limited areas, can be given, the basic problem remains unsolved. One might hope that the transition from classical to quantum-mechanical treatments would remove the difficulties. While there is still hope that this may eventually occur, the present quantum-mechanical discussions are beset with even more elaborate troubles than the classical ones. It is one of the triumphs of comparatively recent years (~1948–50) that the concepts of Lorentz covariance and gauge invariance were exploited sufficiently cleverly to circumvent these difficulties in quantum electrodynamics and so allow the calculation of very small radiative effects to extremely high precision, in full agreement with experiment. From a fundamental point of view, however, the difficulties remain.

The magnetic radiation reaction force is the result of the most fundamental calculation of the effect of self-generated fields. It arises from the observation that accelerating non-relativistic particles with associated magnetic moment emit radiation. The Abraham–Lorentz force is the average force that an accelerating charged particle feels in the recoil from the emission of radiation. The introduction of quantum effects leads one to quantum electrodynamics. The self-fields in quantum electrodynamics generate a finite number of infinities in the calculations that can be removed by the process of renormalization. This has led to a theory that is able to make the most accurate predictions that humans have made to date. See precision tests of QED. The renormalization process fails, however, when applied to the gravitational force. The infinities in that case are infinite in number, which causes the failure of renormalization. Therefore general relativity has unsolved self-field problems. String theory is a current attempt to resolve these problems for all forces.

== Derivation ==
We begin with the Larmor formula for radiation of the second derivative of a magnetic moment with respect to time:
$$P = \frac{\mu_0 \ddot{m}^2}{6 \pi c^3}.$$

In the case that the magnetic moment is produced by an electric charge moving along a circular path is
$$\mathbf{m}=\frac{1}{2}\, q\, \mathbf{r}\times\mathbf{v},$$
where $\mathbf{r}$ is the position of the charge $q$ relative to the center of the circle and $\mathbf{v}$ is the instantaneous velocity of the charge.

The above Larmor formula becomes as follows:
$$P = \frac{\mu_0 q^2 r^2 \dot{a}^2}{24 \pi c^3}.$$

If we assume the motion of a charged particle is periodic, then the average work done on the particle by the Abraham–Lorentz force is the negative of the Larmor power integrated over one period from $\tau_1$ to $\tau_2$:
$$\int_{\tau_1}^{\tau_2} \mathbf{F}_\mathrm{rad} \cdot \mathbf{v} dt
= \int_{\tau_1}^{\tau_2} -P dt
= - \int_{\tau_1}^{\tau_2} \frac{\mu_0 q^2 r^2 \dot{a}^2}{24 \pi c^3} dt
= - \int_{\tau_1}^{\tau_2} \frac{\mu_0 q^2 r^2}{24 \pi c^3} \frac{d \mathbf{a}}{dt} \cdot \frac{d \mathbf{a}}{dt} dt.$$

Notice that we can integrate the above expression by parts. If we assume that there is periodic motion, the boundary term in the integral by parts disappears:
$$\int_{\tau_1}^{\tau_2} \mathbf{F}_\mathrm{rad} \cdot \mathbf{v} dt = -\frac{\mu_0 q^2 r^2}{24 \pi c^3} \frac{d \mathbf{a}}{dt} \cdot \mathbf{a} \bigg|_{\tau_1}^{\tau_2} + \int_{\tau_1}^{\tau_2} \frac{\mu_0 q^2 r^2}{24 \pi c^3} \frac{d^2 \mathbf{a}}{dt^2} \cdot \mathbf{a} dt = -0 + \int_{\tau_1}^{\tau_2} \frac{\mu_0 q^2 r^2}{24 \pi c^3} \mathbf{\ddot{a}} \cdot \mathbf{a} dt.$$

Integrating by parts a second time, we find
$$\int_{\tau_1}^{\tau_2} \mathbf{F}_\mathrm{rad} \cdot \mathbf{v} dt = -\frac{\mu_0 q^2 r^2}{24 \pi c^3} \frac{d \mathbf{a}}{dt} \cdot \mathbf{a} \bigg|_{\tau_1}^{\tau_2}+\frac{\mu_0 q^2 r^2}{24 \pi c^3} \frac{d^3 \mathbf{v}}{dt^3} \cdot \mathbf{v} \bigg|_{\tau_1}^{\tau_2} - \int_{\tau_1}^{\tau_2} \frac{\mu_0 q^2 r^2}{24 \pi c^3} \frac{d^3 \mathbf{a}}{dt^3} \cdot \mathbf{v} dt = -0 + 0-\int_{\tau_1}^{\tau_2} \frac{\mu_0 q^2 r^2}{24 \pi c^3} \frac{d^3 \mathbf{a}}{dt^3} \cdot \mathbf{v} dt.$$

Clearly, we can identify
$$\mathbf{F}_\mathrm{rad} = -\frac{\mu_0 q^2 r^2}{24 \pi c^3} \frac{d^3 \mathbf{a}}{dt^3}.$$

== Signals from the future ==
Below is an illustration of how a classical analysis can lead to surprising results. The classical theory can be seen to challenge standard pictures of causality, thus signaling either a breakdown or a need for extension of the theory. In this case the extension is to quantum mechanics and its relativistic counterpart quantum field theory. See the quote from Rohrlich in the introduction concerning "the importance of obeying the validity limits of a physical theory".

For a particle in an external force $\mathbf{F}_\mathrm{ext}$, we have
$$m \dot {\mathbf{v} } = \mathbf{F}_\mathrm{rad} + \mathbf{F}_\mathrm{ext} = m t_0 \ddot { \mathbf{v}} + \mathbf{F}_\mathrm{ext} ,$$
where
$$t_0 = \frac{\mu_0 q^2}{6 \pi m c}.$$

This equation can be integrated once to obtain
$$m \dot {\mathbf{v} } = {1 \over t_0} \int_t^{\infty} \exp \left( - {t'-t \over t_0 }\right ) \, \mathbf{F}_\mathrm{ext}(t') \, dt' .$$

The integral extends from the present to infinitely far in the future. Thus future values of the force affect the acceleration of the particle in the present. The future values are weighted by the factor
$$\exp \left( -{t'-t \over t_0 }\right )$$
which falls off rapidly for times greater than $t_0$ in the future. Therefore, signals from an interval approximately $t_0$ into the future affect the acceleration in the present. For an electron, this time is approximately $10^{-24}$ sec, which is the time it takes for a light wave to travel across the "size" of an electron.

== See also ==
- Max Abraham
- Hendrik Lorentz
- Cyclotron radiation
- Electromagnetic mass
- Radiation resistance
- Radiation damping
- Synchrotron radiation
- Wheeler–Feynman absorber theory
