= Photocathode =

Surface which converts light into electrons via the photoelectric effect

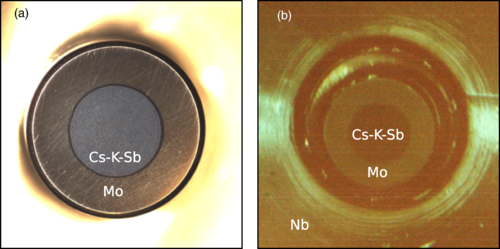
Cs-K-Sb photocathode centered on a Molybdenum plug (a) after growth in the preparation chamber and (b) after transfer into the photoinjector

A photocathode is a surface engineered to convert light (photons) into electrons using the photoelectric effect. Photocathodes are important in accelerator physics where they are utilised in a photoinjector to generate high brightness electron beams. Electron beams generated with photocathodes are commonly used for free electron lasers and for ultrafast electron diffraction. Photocathodes are also commonly used as the negatively charged electrode in a light detection device such as a photomultiplier, phototube and image intensifier.

== Important Properties ==
=== Quantum Efficiency (QE) ===
Quantum efficiency is a unitless number that measures the sensitivity of the photocathode to light. It is the ratio of the number of electrons emitted to the number of incident photons. This property depends on the wavelength of light being used to illuminate the photocathode. For many applications, QE is the most important property as the photocathodes are used solely for converting photons into an electrical signal.

Quantum efficiency may be calculated from photocurrent ($I$), laser power ($P_{\text{laser}}$), and either the photon energy ($E_{\text{photon}}$) or laser wavelength ($\lambda_{\text{laser}}$) using the following equation.

$$\text{QE} = \frac{N_{\text{electron}}}{N_{\text{photon}}}
= \frac{I\cdot E_{\text{photon}}}{P_{\text{laser}}\cdot e}
\approx \frac{ \overset{ [\text{amps}] }{I} \cdot 1240}{ \underset{ [\text{watts}] }{ P_{\text{laser} }} \cdot \underset{ [\text{nm}] }{ \lambda_{\text{laser} } }}$$

=== Mean Transverse Energy (MTE) and Thermal Emittance ===
For some applications, the initial momentum distribution of emitted electrons is important and the mean transverse energy (MTE) and thermal emittance are popular metrics for this. The MTE is the variance of the transverse momentum in a direction along the photocathode's surface and is most commonly reported in units of milli-electron volts.

$$\text{MTE} = \frac{\langle p_{\perp}^2 \rangle}{2m_e}$$

In high brightness photoinjectors, the MTE helps to determine the initial emittance of the beam which is the area in phase space occupied by the electrons. The emittance ($\varepsilon$) can be calculated from MTE and the laser spot size on the photocathode ($\sigma_x$) using the following equation.

$$\varepsilon = \sigma_x\sqrt{\frac{\text{MTE}}{m_ec^2}}$$

where $m_ec^2$ is the rest mass of an electron. In commonly used units, this is as follows.

$$\overset{[\mu\text{m}]}{\varepsilon} \approx \overset{[\mu\text{m}]}{\sigma_x} \sqrt{\frac{ \overset{ [\text{meV}] }{ \text{MTE} }}{511 \times 10^6}}$$

Because of the scaling of transverse emittance with MTE, it is sometimes useful to write the equation in terms of a new quantity called the thermal emittance. The thermal emittance is derived from MTE using the following equation.

$$\varepsilon_{\text{th}} = \sqrt{\frac{\text{MTE}}{m_ec^2}}$$

It is most often expressed in the ratio um/mm to express the growth of emittance in units of um as the laser spot grows (measured in units of mm).

An equivalent definition of MTE is the temperature of electrons emitted in vacuum. The MTE of electrons emitted from commonly used photocathodes, such as polycrystalline metals, is limited by the excess energy (the difference between the energy of the incident photons and the photocathode's work function) provided to the electrons. To limit MTE, photocathodes are often operated near the photoemission threshold, where the excess energy tends to zero. In this limit, the majority of photoemission comes from the tail of the Fermi distribution. Therefore, MTE is thermally limited to $k_BT$, where $k_B$ is the Boltzmann constant and $T$ is the temperature of electrons in the solid.

Due to conservation of transverse momentum and energy in the photoemission process, the MTE of a clean, atomically ordered, single crystalline photocathode is determined by the material's band structure. An ideal band structure for low MTEs is one that does not allow photoemission from large transverse momentum states.

Outside of accelerator physics, MTE and thermal emittance play a role in the resolution of proximity-focused imaging devices that use photocathodes. This is important for applications such as image intensifiers, wavelength converters, and the now obsolete image tubes.

=== Lifetime ===
Many photocathodes require excellent vacuum conditions to function and will become "poisoned" when exposed to contaminates. Additionally, using the photocathodes in high current applications will slowly damage the compounds as they are exposed to ion back-bombardment. These effects are quantified by the lifetime of the photocathode. Cathode death is modeled as a decaying exponential as a function of either time or emitted charge. Lifetime is then the time constant of the exponential.

== Uses ==
For many years the photocathode was the only practical method for converting light to an electron current. As such it tends to function as a form of 'electric film' and shared many characteristics of photography. It was therefore the key element in opto-electronic devices, such as TV camera tubes like the orthicon and vidicon, and in image tubes such as intensifiers, converters, and dissectors. Simple phototubes were used for motion detectors and counters.

Phototubes have been used for years in movie projectors to read the sound tracks on the edge of movie film.

The more recent development of solid state optical devices such as photodiodes has reduced the use of photocathodes to cases where they still remain superior to semiconductor devices.

== Construction ==
Photocathodes operate in a vacuum, so their design parallels vacuum tube technology. Since most cathodes are sensitive to air the construction of photocathodes typically occurs after the enclosure has been evacuated. In operation the photocathode requires an electric field with a nearby positive anode to assure electron emission. Molecular beam epitaxy is broadly applied in today's manufacturing of photocathode. By using a substrate with matched lattice parameters, crystalline photocathodes can be made and electron beams can come out from the same position in lattice's Brillouin zone to get high brightness electron beams.

Photocathodes divide into two broad groups; transmission and reflective. A transmission type is typically a coating upon a glass window in which the light strikes one surface and electrons exit from the opposite surface. A reflective type is typically formed on an opaque metal electrode base, where the light enters and the electrons exit from the same side. A variation is the double reflection type, where the metal base is mirror-like, causing light that passed through the photocathode without causing emission to be bounced back for a second try. This mimics the retina on many mammals.

The effectiveness of a photocathode is commonly expressed as quantum efficiency, that being the ratio of emitted electrons vs. impinging quanta (of light). The efficiency varies with construction as well, as it can be improved with a stronger electric field.

== Characterization ==
The surface of photocathodes can be characterized by various surface sensitive techniques like scanning tunneling microscopy (STM) and X-ray photoelectron spectroscopy.

== Coatings ==
Although a plain metallic cathode will exhibit photoelectric properties, the specialized coating greatly increases the effect. A photocathode usually consists of alkali metals with very low work functions.

The coating releases electrons much more readily than the underlying metal, allowing it to detect the low-energy photons in infrared radiation. The lens transmits the radiation from the object being viewed to a layer of coated glass. The photons strike the metal surface and transfer electrons to its rear side. The freed electrons are then collected to produce the final image.

== Photocathode materials ==
- Ag-O-Cs, also called S-1. This was the first compound photocathode material, developed in 1929. Sensitivity from 300 nm to 1200 nm. Since Ag-O-Cs has a higher dark current than more modern materials, photomultiplier tubes with this photocathode material are nowadays used only in the infrared region with cooling.
- Sb-Cs (antimony-caesium) has a spectral response from UV to visible and is mainly used in reflection-mode photocathodes.
- Bialkali (antimony-rubidium-caesium Sb-Rb-Cs, antimony-potassium-caesium Sb-K-Cs). Spectral response range similar to the Sb-Cs photocathode, but with higher sensitivity and lower dark current than Sb-Cs. They have sensitivity well matched to the most common scintillator materials and so are frequently used for ionizing radiation measurement in scintillation counters.
- High temperature bialkali or low noise bialkali (sodium-potassium-antimony, Na-K-Sb). This material is often used in oil well logging since it can withstand temperatures up to 175 °C. At room temperatures, this photocathode operates with very low dark current, making it ideal for use in photon counting applications.
- Multialkali (sodium-potassium-antimony-caesium, Na-K-Sb-Cs), also called S-20. The multialkali photocathode has a wide spectral response from the ultraviolet to near infrared region. It is widely used for broad-band spectrophotometers and photon counting applications. The long wavelength response can be extended to 930 nm by a special photocathode activation processing. With the broadened response, this is sometimes referred to as S-25.
- GaAs (gallium(II) arsenide). This photocathode material covers a wider spectral response range than multialkali, from ultraviolet to 930 nm. GaAs photocathodes are also used in accelerator facilities where polarized electrons are required. One of the important property of GaAs photocathode is, it can achieve Negative Electron Affinity due to Cs deposition on the surface. However GaAs is very delicate and loses Quantum Efficiency(QE) due to couple of damage mechanism. Ion Back Bombardment is one of the main cause of GaAs cathode QE decay.
- InGaAs (indium gallium arsenide). Extended sensitivity in the infrared range compared to GaAs. Moreover, in the range between 900 nm and 1000 nm, InGaAs has a much better signal-to-noise ratio than Ag-O-Cs. With special manufacturing techniques this photocathode can operate up to 1700 nm.
- Cs-Te, Cs-I (caesium-telluride, caesium iodide). These materials are sensitive to vacuum UV and UV rays but not to visible light and are therefore referred to as solar blind. Cs-Te is insensitive to wavelengths longer than 320 nm, and Cs-I to those longer than 200 nm.
