= 4C +69.15 =

Radio galaxy in the constellation Ursa Minor

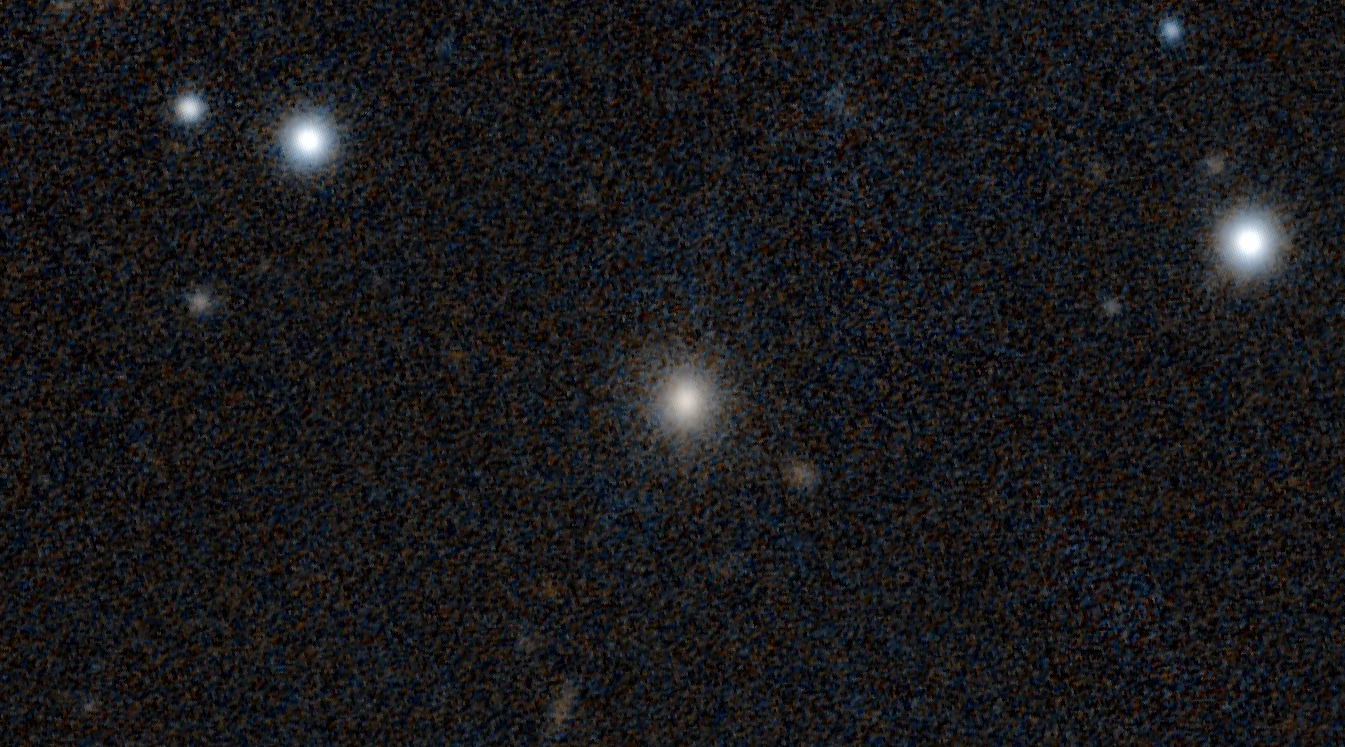
- Pan-STARRS image of 4C +69.15

Observation data (J2000.0 epoch)
- Constellation: Ursa Minor
- Right ascension: 13^{h} 13^{m} 58.91^{s}
- Declination: +69° 37′ 18.57″
- Redshift: 0.106000
- Heliocentric radial velocity: 31,778 ± 0 km/s
- Distance: 1,535.3 ± 107.5 Mly (470.74 ± 32.95 Mpc)
- magnitude (J): 15.15

Characteristics
- Size: ~150,000 ly (46.0 kpc) (estimated)

Other designations
- 2MASX J13135885+6937179, DA 340, 8C 1312+698, GRS J1313+6937, LEDA 2731403, TXS 1312+698, VLSS J1313.9+6937

4C +69.15 also known as B1312+698, is a radio galaxy located in the constellation of Ursa Minor. The redshift of the galaxy is (z) 0.106 and it was first discovered as an extragalactic radio source by astronomers in November 1985.

== Description ==
4C +69.15 is classified as a giant Fanaroff-Riley Class type II radio galaxy with a total linear size projection of 1.06 megaparsecs. The host galaxy has a southeast to northeast orientation. The source is compact, with a weak radio core and a bridge of radio emission based on radio imaging made by the Very Large Array (VLA) and Giant Metrewave Radio Telescope. The core is suggested to have a power spectrum turnover less than 1 GHz frequencies, with the core spectral index of around -0.4 between the range of 1.4 and 4.8 GHz. The core contains a steep radio spectrum, suggesting a new phase of activity.

A study published in October 2000, has found two radio lobes located in the east and west directions. These lobes are estimated to have ages of 8.0 ± 0.4 and 6.1 ± 0.5 × 10^{7} years based on CI modelling. The equipartition magnetic field densities of 21.8 ± 2.3 and 50.1 ± 5.7 × 10^{−14} erg cm^{−3}. The total energy for the eastern lobe is 2.75 ± 0.51 × 10^{59} erg while the western lobe has a total energy of 3.11 ± 0.57 × 10^{59} erg. There is an unpolarized feature interpreted as a radio jet.
