= Cyclotron turnover =

Cyclotron turnover is one of two phenomena due to which the power spectrum of synchrotron radiation decreases at very low frequencies. The other is synchrotron self-absorption. While the synchrotron self-absorption is determined from detailed balance, cyclotron turnover occurs when the assumptions of synchrotron radiation are violated. When a charged particle moves in a magnetic field, its orbit is a helix, and its velocities can be divided into two independent components: uniform velocity parallel to the axis of the helix and rotation about the axis. Synchrotron radiation requires that both velocities be ultra-relativistic, but if the velocity parallel to the axis is relativistic and the rotation is not, then the spectrum would simply be that of a Doppler-shifted cyclotron radiation, and this behavior is called cyclotron turnover. In real systems there would be a competition between these two phenomena, so the only one that sets in at higher frequencies will be observed. An interesting feature about the cyclotron turnover is that it allows emission at frequencies lower than the cyclotron frequency, if the particle is moving away from the observer.
