= Radiation damping =

Way of focusing a charged particle beam

Radiation damping in accelerator physics is a phenomenon where betatron oscillations and longitudinal oscillations of the particle are damped due to energy loss by synchrotron radiation. It can be used to reduce the beam emittance of a high-velocity charged particle beam.

The two main ways of using radiation damping to reduce the emittance of a particle beam are the use of undulators and damping rings (often containing undulators), both relying on the same principle of inducing synchrotron radiation to reduce the particles' momentum, then replacing the momentum only in the desired direction of motion.

== Damping rings ==
As particles are moving in a closed orbit, the lateral acceleration causes them to emit synchrotron radiation, thereby reducing the size of their momentum vectors (relative to the design orbit) without changing their orientation (ignoring the quantum fluctuations of the radiation for the moment). In longitudinal direction, the loss of particle impulse due to radiation is replaced by accelerating sections (RF cavities) that are installed in the beam path so that an equilibrium is reached at the design energy of the accelerator. Since this is not happening in transverse direction, where the emittance of the beam is only increased by the quantization of radiation losses (quantum effects), the transverse equilibrium emittance of the particle beam will be smaller with large radiation losses, compared to small radiation losses.

Because high orbit curvatures (low curvature radii) increase the emission of synchrotron radiation, damping rings are often small. If long beams with many particle bunches are needed to fill a larger storage ring, the damping ring may be extended with long straight sections.

== Undulators and wigglers ==
When faster damping is required than can be provided by the turns inherent in a damping ring, it is common to add undulator or wiggler magnets to induce more synchrotron radiation. These are devices with periodic magnetic fields that cause the particles to oscillate transversely, equivalent to many small tight turns. These operate using the same principle as damping rings and this oscillation causes the charged particles to emit synchrotron radiation.

The many small turns in an undulator have the advantage that the cone of synchrotron radiation is all in one direction, forward. This is easier to shield than the broad fan produced by a large turn.

== Energy loss ==
The power radiated by a charged particle is given by a generalization of the Larmor formula derived by Liénard in 1898

$$P = \frac{e^2}{6\pi\varepsilon_0 c^3} \gamma^6 \left[\left|\dot\mathbf{v}\right|^2 - \frac{\left|\mathbf{v} \times \dot\mathbf{v}\right|^2}{c^2}\right],$$
where $\mathbf{v} = \boldsymbol{\beta} c$ is the velocity of the particle, $\dot \mathbf{v} = \frac{d\mathbf{v}}{dt}$ the acceleration, e the elementary charge, $\varepsilon_0$ the vacuum permittivity, $\gamma$ the Lorentz factor and $c$ the speed of light.

Note:

- $\mathbf{p} = \gamma m_0 \mathbf{v}$ is the momentum and $m_0$ is the mass of the particle.
- $\dot\gamma = \frac{d\gamma}{dt} = \gamma^3 \boldsymbol\beta \cdot \dot \boldsymbol\beta = \gamma^3\frac{\mathbf{v} \cdot \dot \mathbf{v}}{c^2}$
- $\dot\mathbf{p} = \frac{d\mathbf{p}}{dt} = \gamma^3 \frac{\mathbf{v} \cdot \dot \mathbf{v}}{c^2} m_0 \mathbf{v} + \gamma m_0 \dot \mathbf{v}$

=== Linac and RF Cavities ===
In case of an acceleration parallel to the longitudinal axis ($\mathbf{v} \times \dot\mathbf{v} = 0$), the radiated power can be calculated as below

$$\frac{dp_{\parallel}}{dt} = \gamma^3 \frac{v \dot v}{c^2} m_0 v + \gamma m_0 \dot v = \gamma^3 m_0 \dot v \left[ \frac{v^2}{c^2} + \frac{1}{\gamma^2} \right] = \gamma^3 m_0 \dot v$$

Where $\dot v$, $v$ are the respective coordinates along the longitudinal axis of $\dot \mathbf{v}$, $\mathbf{v}$.

Inserting in Larmor's formula gives

$$P_{\parallel} = \frac{e^2}{6\pi\varepsilon_0 {m_0}^2 c^3} \left(\frac{dp_{\parallel}}{dt}\right)^2$$

=== Bending ===
In case of an acceleration perpendicular to the longitudinal axis ($\mathbf{v} \cdot \dot\mathbf{v} = 0$)

$$\frac{dp_{\perp}}{dt} = \gamma m_0 \dot v$$

Inserting in Larmor's formula gives (Hint: Factor $1/(\gamma m_0)^2$ and use $1{-}v^2/c^2 = 1/\gamma^2$)

$$P_{\perp} = \frac{e^2 \gamma^2}{6\pi\varepsilon_0 {m_0}^2 c^3 } \left( \frac{dp_{\perp}}{dt} \right)^2 = \frac{2}{3} \frac{r_e c}{{E_0}^3} E^2  \left( \frac{dp_{\perp}}{dt} \right)^2$$

where $r_e$ is the classical electron radius, $E_0$ the rest energy, and $E$ the energy.

Using magnetic field perpendicular to velocity

$$\mathbf{F} = \frac{d\mathbf{p}}{dt} = e \mathbf{v} \times \mathbf{B}$$

$$F_{\perp} = \frac{dp_{\perp}}{dt} = evB = e \beta c B$$

where $F_{\perp}$ is the norm of the projection of $F$ on the transverse plane.

$$\begin{align}
P_{\gamma} &= \frac{e^2 \gamma^2}{6\pi\varepsilon_0 {m_0}^2 c^3 }\left(e \beta c B\right)^2 \\[1ex]
&= \frac{e^4 \beta^2 \gamma^2 B^2}{6\pi\varepsilon_0 {m_0}^2 c } \\[1ex]
&= \frac{e^4 }{6\pi\varepsilon_0 {m_0}^4 c^5 }\beta^2 E^2 B^2
\end{align}$$

Using radius of curvature $\dot v=\frac{\beta^2 c^2}{\rho}$ and inserting $\gamma m_0 \dot v$ in $P_{\perp}$ gives

$$P_{\gamma} = \frac{e^2c}{6\pi\varepsilon_0} \frac{\beta^4 \gamma ^4}{\rho ^2}$$

==== Electron ====
Here are some useful formulas to calculate the power radiated by an electron accelerated by a magnetic field perpendicular to the velocity and $\beta \approx 1$.

$$P_{\gamma}=\frac{e^4}{6\pi\varepsilon_0{m_e}^4c^5}E^2B^2$$

where $E = \gamma m_e c^2$, $B$ is the perpendicular magnetic field, $m_e$ the electron mass.
$$P_{\gamma}=\frac{e^2}{6\pi\varepsilon_0 c^3}\frac{\gamma ^4}{\rho ^2}$$

Using the classical electron radius $r_e$

$$\begin{align}
P_{\gamma} &= \frac{2}{3}\frac{r_e c}{(m_ec^2)^3}\frac{E^4}{\rho ^2} \\[1ex]
&= \frac{2}{3} \frac{r_e c}{m_ec^2}\frac{\gamma^2 E^2}{\rho ^2}
=\frac{2}{3} r_e c \frac{\gamma^3 E}{\rho ^2} \\[1ex]
&=\frac{2}{3} r_e m_e c^3 \frac{\gamma^4 }{\rho ^2}
\end{align}$$

where $\rho$ is the radius of curvature, $\rho=\frac{E}{e c B}$

$\rho$ can also be derived from particle coordinates (using common 6D phase space coordinates system x, x′, y, y′, s, Δp/p_{0}) , Δp/p_{0} is the fractional momentum deviation:

$$\rho = \left|\frac{ds}{d\varphi} \right| \approx \frac{\Delta_s}{\sqrt{{\Delta_{x'}}^2+{\Delta_{y'}}^2}}$$

Note: The transverse magnetic field is often normalized using the magnet rigidity:
$$B\rho = \frac{10^9}{c} E_\text{[GeV]} \approx 3.3356 E_\text{[GeV]} \text{[Tm]}$$

Field expansion (using Laurent series): $\frac{b_y + ib_x}{B\rho} = \sum_{n=0}^{k} (ia_n + b_n) (x+iy)^n$ where $(b_x,b_y)$ is the transverse field expressed in [T], $(a_n,b_n)$ the multipole field strengths (skew and normal) expressed in $[m^{-n+1}]$, $(x,y)$ the particle position and $k$ the multipole order, k=0 for a dipole, k=1 for a quadrupole, k=2 for a sextupole, etc...

== See also ==
- Particle beam cooling
