= Beam emittance =

Property of a charged particle beam

Samples of a bivariate normal distribution, representing particles in phase space, with position horizontal and momentum vertical.

In accelerator physics, emittance is a property of a charged particle beam. It refers to the area occupied by the beam in a position-and-momentum phase space.

Each particle in a beam can be described by its position and momentum along each of three orthogonal axes, for a total of six position and momentum coordinates. When the position and momentum for a single axis are plotted on a two dimensional graph, the average spread of the coordinates on this plot is the emittance for that axis. As such, a beam will have three emittances, one along each axis, which can be described independently. As particle momentum along an axis is usually described as an angle relative to that axis, an area on a position-momentum plot will typically have dimensions of length × angle (for example, millimeters × milliradian).

Emittance is important for analysis of particle beams. As long as the beam is only subjected to conservative forces, Liouville's theorem shows that emittance is a conserved quantity. If the distribution over phase space is represented as a cloud in a plot (see figure), emittance is the area of the cloud. A variety of more exact definitions account for the imprecise borders of the cloud and the case of a cloud that does not have an elliptical shape. In addition, the emittance along each axis is independent unless the beam passes through beamline elements (such as solenoid magnets) which correlate them.

A low-emittance particle beam is a beam where the particles are confined to a small region and have nearly the same momentum, which is a desirable property for ensuring that the entire beam is transported to its destination. In a colliding beam accelerator, keeping the emittance small means that the likelihood of particle interactions will be greater, resulting in higher luminosity. In a synchrotron light source, low emittance means that the resulting x-ray beam will be small, and result in higher brightness.

== Definitions ==
The coordinate system used to describe the motion of particles in an accelerator has three orthogonal axes, but rather than being centered on a fixed point in space, they are oriented with respect to the trajectory of an "ideal" particle moving through the accelerator with no deviation from the intended speed, position, or direction. Motion along this design trajectory is referred to as the longitudinal axis, and the two axes perpendicular to this trajectory (usually oriented horizontally and vertically) are referred to as transverse axes. The most common convention is for the longitudinal axis to be labelled $z$ and the transverse axes to be labelled $x$ and $y$.

Emittance has units of length, but is usually referred to as "length × angle", for example, "millimeter × milliradians". It can be measured in all three spatial dimensions.

=== Geometric transverse emittance ===
When a particle moves through a circular accelerator or storage ring, the position $x$ and angle $x'$ of the particle in the x direction will trace an ellipse in $x/x'$ phase space. (All of this section applies equivalently to $y$ and $y'$) This ellipse can be described by the following equation:

$$\frac{\varepsilon}{\pi} = \gamma x^2 + 2\alpha x x' + \beta x'^2$$

where x and x′ are the position and angle of the particle, and $\beta, \alpha, \gamma$ are the Courant–Snyder (Twiss) parameters, calculated from the shape of the ellipse.

The emittance is given by $\varepsilon$, and has units of length × angle. However, many sources will move the factor of $\pi$ into the units of emittance rather than including the specific value, giving units of "length × angle × $\pi$."

This formula is the single particle emittance, which describes the area enclosed by the trajectory of a single particle in phase space. However, emittance is more useful as a description of the collective properties of the particles in a beam, rather than of a single particle. Since beam particles are not necessarily distributed uniformly in phase space, definitions of emittance for an entire beam will be based on the area of the ellipse required to enclose a specific fraction of the beam particles.

If the beam is distributed in phase space with a Gaussian distribution, the emittance of the beam may be specified in terms of the root mean square value of $x$ and the fraction of the beam to be included in the emittance.

The equation for the emittance of a Gaussian beam is:

$$\varepsilon = - \frac{2 \pi \sigma^2}{\beta}ln(1-F)$$

where $\sigma$ is the root mean square width of the beam, $\beta$ is the Courant-Snyder $\beta$, and $F$ is the fraction of the beam to be enclosed in the ellipse, given as a number between 0 and 1. Here the factor of $\pi$ is shown on the right of the equation, and would often be included in the units of emittance, rather than being multiplied in to the computed value.

The value chosen for $F$ will depend on the application and the author, and a number of different choices exist in the literature. Some common choices and their equivalent definition of emittance are:

| $\varepsilon$ | $F$ |
|---|---|
| $\frac{\sigma^2}{\beta}$ | 0.15 |
| $\frac{\pi \sigma^2}{\beta}$ | 0.39 |
| $\frac{4 \pi \sigma^2}{\beta}$ | 0.87 |
| $\frac{6 \pi \sigma^2}{\beta}$ | 0.95 |

While the x and y axes are generally equivalent mathematically, in horizontal rings where the x coordinate represents the plane of the ring, consideration of dispersion can be added to the equation of the emittance. Because the magnetic force of a bending magnet is dependent on the energy of the particle being bent, particles of different energies will be bent along different trajectories through the magnet, even if their initial position and angle are the same. The effect of this dispersion on the beam emittance is given by:

$$\varepsilon_x = \frac{\sigma_x^2}{\beta_x(s)} - \frac{D(s)^2}{\beta_x}(\frac{\sigma_p}{p_o})^2$$

where $D(s)$ is the dispersion at location s, $p_o$ is the ideal particle momentum, and $\sigma_p$ is the root mean square of the momentum difference of the particles in the beam from the ideal momentum. (This definition assumes F=0.15)

=== Longitudinal emittance ===
The geometrical definition of longitudinal emittance is more complex than that of transverse emittance. While the $x$ and $y$ coordinates represent deviation from a reference trajectory which remains static, the $z$ coordinate represents deviation from a reference particle, which is itself moving with a specified energy. This deviation can be expressed in terms of distance along the reference trajectory, time of flight along the reference trajectory (how "early" or "late" the particle is compared to the reference), or phase (for a specified reference frequency).

In turn, the $z'$ coordinate is generally not expressed as an angle. Since $z'$ represents the change in z over time, it corresponds to the forward motion of the particle. This can be given in absolute terms, as a velocity, momentum, or energy, or in relative terms, as a fraction of the position, momentum, or energy of the reference particle.

However, the fundamental concept of emittance is the same—the positions of the particles in a beam are plotted along one axis of a phase space plot, the rate of change of those positions over time is plotted on the other axis, and the emittance is a measure of the area occupied on that plot.

One possible definition of longitudinal emittance is given by:

$\varepsilon_{\phi} = \int_S \frac{\Delta E}{\omega_{rf}} d\phi$

where the integral is taken along a path $S$ which tightly encloses the beam particles in $E/\phi$ phase space. Here $\omega_{rf}$ is the reference frequency and the longitudinal coordinate $\phi$ is the phase of the particles relative to a reference particle. Longitudinal equations such as this one often must be solved numerically, rather than analytically.

=== RMS emittance ===
The geometric definition of emittance assumes that the distribution of particles in phase space can be reasonably well characterized by an ellipse. In addition, the definitions using the root mean square of the particle distribution assume a Gaussian particle distribution.

In cases where these assumptions do not hold, it is still possible to define a beam emittance using the moments of the distribution. Here, the RMS emittance ($\varepsilon_{\text{RMS}}$) is defined to be,

$\varepsilon_{\text{RMS}} = \sqrt{\langle x^2\rangle\langle x^{\prime 2}\rangle - \langle x\cdot x^{\prime}\rangle^2}$

where $\langle x^2\rangle$ is the variance of the particle's position, $\langle x^{\prime2}\rangle$ is the variance of the angle a particle makes with the direction of travel in the accelerator ($x^\prime = \frac{\mathrm{d}x}{\mathrm{d}z}$ with $z$ along the direction of travel), and $\langle x\cdot x^\prime \rangle$ represents an angle-position correlation of particles in the beam. This definition is equivalent to the geometric emittance in the case of an elliptical particle distribution in phase space.

The emittance may also be expressed as the determinant of the variance-covariance matrix of the beam's phase space coordinates where it becomes clear that quantity describes an effective area occupied by the beam in terms of its second order statistics.

$$\varepsilon_{\text{RMS}} = \sqrt{\begin{vmatrix} \langle x\cdot x\rangle & \langle x\cdot x^{\prime}\rangle \\ \langle x\cdot x^{\prime}\rangle &\langle x^{\prime}\cdot x^{\prime}\rangle \end{vmatrix}}$$

Depending on context, some definitions of RMS emittance will add a scaling factor to correspond to a fraction of the total distribution, to facilitate comparison with geometric emittances using the same fraction.

==== RMS emittance in higher dimensions ====
It is sometimes useful to talk about phase space area for either four dimensional transverse phase space (IE $x$, $x^\prime$, $y$, $y^\prime$) or the full six dimensional phase space of particles (IE $x$, $x^\prime$, $y$, $y^\prime$, $\Delta z$, $\Delta z^\prime$). The RMS emittance generalizes to full three dimensional space as shown:

$$\varepsilon_{\text{RMS},6D} = \sqrt{\begin{vmatrix}
\langle x\cdot x\rangle & \langle x\cdot x^{\prime}\rangle &\langle x\cdot y\rangle & \langle x\cdot y^{\prime}\rangle &\langle x\cdot z\rangle & \langle x\cdot z^{\prime}\rangle\\
\langle x^{\prime}\cdot x\rangle & \langle x^{\prime}\cdot x^{\prime}\rangle &\langle x^{\prime}\cdot y\rangle & \langle x^{\prime}\cdot y^{\prime}\rangle&\langle x^{\prime}\cdot z\rangle & \langle x^{\prime}\cdot z^{\prime}\rangle \\
\langle y\cdot x\rangle & \langle y\cdot x^{\prime}\rangle &\langle y\cdot y\rangle & \langle y\cdot y^{\prime}\rangle&\langle y\cdot z\rangle & \langle y\cdot z^{\prime}\rangle  \\
\langle y^\prime\cdot x\rangle & \langle y^\prime\cdot x^{\prime}\rangle &\langle y^\prime\cdot y\rangle & \langle y^\prime\cdot y^{\prime}\rangle&\langle y^\prime\cdot z\rangle & \langle y^\prime\cdot z^{\prime}\rangle \\
\langle z\cdot x\rangle & \langle z\cdot x^{\prime}\rangle &\langle z\cdot y\rangle & \langle z\cdot y^{\prime}\rangle&\langle z\cdot z\rangle & \langle z\cdot z^{\prime}\rangle  \\
\langle z^\prime\cdot x\rangle & \langle z^\prime\cdot x^{\prime}\rangle &\langle z^\prime\cdot y\rangle & \langle z^\prime\cdot y^{\prime}\rangle&\langle z^\prime\cdot z\rangle & \langle z^\prime\cdot z^{\prime}\rangle \\
\end{vmatrix}}$$

In the absences of correlations between different axes in the particle accelerator, most of these matrix elements become zero and we are left with a product of the emittance along each axis.

$$\varepsilon_{\text{RMS},6D} = \sqrt{\begin{vmatrix}
\langle x\cdot x\rangle & \langle x\cdot x^{\prime}\rangle & 0 & 0 & 0 & 0 \\
\langle x^{\prime}\cdot x\rangle & \langle x^{\prime}\cdot x^{\prime}\rangle & 0 & 0 & 0 & 0 \\
0 & 0 &\langle y\cdot y\rangle & \langle y\cdot y^{\prime}\rangle&0 & 0  \\
0 & 0 &\langle y^\prime\cdot y\rangle & \langle y^\prime\cdot y^{\prime}\rangle& 0 & 0 \\
0 & 0 & 0 & 0 &\langle z\cdot z\rangle & \langle z\cdot z^{\prime}\rangle  \\
0 & 0 & 0 & 0 &\langle z^\prime\cdot z\rangle & \langle z^\prime\cdot z^{\prime}\rangle \\
\end{vmatrix}}
=
\sqrt{\begin{vmatrix}
\langle x\cdot x\rangle & \langle x\cdot x^{\prime}\rangle\\
\langle x^{\prime}\cdot x\rangle & \langle x^{\prime}\cdot x^{\prime}\rangle \\
\end{vmatrix}}
\sqrt{\begin{vmatrix}
\langle y\cdot y\rangle & \langle y\cdot y^{\prime}\rangle\\
\langle y^{\prime}\cdot y\rangle & \langle y^{\prime}\cdot y^{\prime}\rangle \\
\end{vmatrix}}
\sqrt{\begin{vmatrix}
\langle z\cdot z\rangle & \langle z\cdot z^{\prime}\rangle\\
\langle z^{\prime}\cdot z\rangle & \langle z^{\prime}\cdot z^{\prime}\rangle \\
\end{vmatrix}} = \varepsilon_x\varepsilon_y\varepsilon_z$$

=== Normalized emittance ===
Although the previous definitions of emittance remain constant for linear beam transport, they do change when the particles undergo acceleration (an effect called adiabatic damping). In some applications, such as for linear accelerators, photoinjectors, and the accelerating sections of larger systems, it becomes important to compare beam quality across different energies. Normalized emittance, which is invariant under acceleration, is used for this purpose.

Normalized emittance in one dimension is given by:

$$\varepsilon_{n} = \sqrt{\langle x^2\rangle\langle \left(\gamma \beta_x\right)^{2}\rangle - \langle x\cdot \gamma \beta_x\rangle^2} =
{\sqrt {\begin{vmatrix}\langle x\cdot x\rangle &\langle x\cdot \gamma \beta_x\rangle \\\langle x\cdot \gamma \beta_x\rangle &\langle \gamma \beta_x \cdot \gamma \beta_x\rangle \end{vmatrix}}}$$

The angle $x^\prime = \frac{\mathrm{d}x}{\mathrm{d}z}$ in the prior definition has been replaced with the normalized transverse momentum $\frac{p_x}{mc} = \gamma \beta_x$, where $\gamma$ is the Lorentz factor and $\beta_x = v_x/c$ is the normalized transverse velocity.

Normalized emittance is related to the previous definitions of emittance through $\gamma$ and the normalized velocity in the direction of the beam's travel ($\beta_z = v_z/c$):

$$\varepsilon_n = \gamma\beta_z\varepsilon$$

The normalized emittance does not change as a function of energy and so can be used to indicate beam degradation if the particles are accelerated. For speeds close to the speed of light, where $\beta=v/c$ is close to one, the emittance is approximately inversely proportional to the energy. In this case, the physical width of the beam will vary inversely with the square root of the energy.

Higher dimensional versions of the normalized emittance can be defined in analogy to the RMS version by replacing all angles with their corresponding momenta.

== Measurement ==
=== Quadrupole scan technique ===
One of the most fundamental methods of measuring beam emittance is the quadrupole scan method. The emittance of the beam for a particular plane of interest (i.e., horizontal or vertical) can be obtained by varying the field strength of a quadrupole (or quadrupoles) upstream of a monitor (i.e., a wire or a screen).

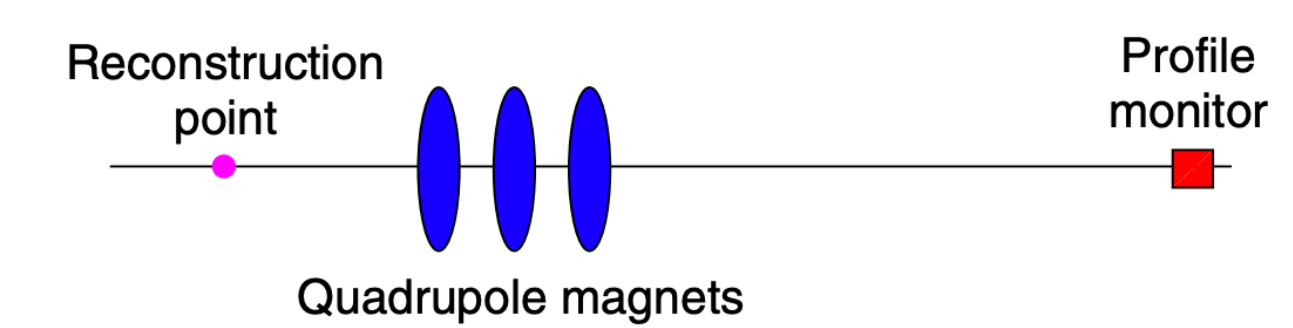
A schematic of the accelerator optics used in the quadrupole scan technique.

The properties of a beam can be described as the following beam matrix.

$$\Sigma = \begin{bmatrix} \langle x\cdot x \rangle & \langle x\cdot x^{\prime} \rangle \\ \langle x\cdot x^{\prime} \rangle & \langle x^{\prime}\cdot x^{\prime} \rangle \end{bmatrix} = \begin{bmatrix} \sigma_{11} & \sigma_{12} \\ \sigma_{21} & \sigma_{22} \end{bmatrix}$$

where $x^\prime = {dx \over dz}$ is the derivative of x with respect to the longitudinal coordinate. The forces experienced by the beam as it travels down the beam line and passes through the quadrupole(s) are described using the transfer matrix $R$ of the beam line, including the quadrupole(s) and other beam line components such as drifts:

$$R = S_1 Q S_2 = \begin{pmatrix} r_{11} & r_{12} \\ r_{21} & r_{22} \end{pmatrix}$$

Here $S_1$ is the transfer matrix between the original beam position and the quadrupole(s), $Q$ is the transfer matrix of the quadrupole(s), and $S_2$ is the transfer matrix between the quadrupole(s) and the monitor screen. During the quadrupole scan process, $S_1$ and $S_2$ stay constant, and $Q$ changes with the field strength of the quadrupole(s).

The final beam when it reaches the monitor screen at distance s from its original position can be described as another beam matrix $\Sigma_s$:

$$\Sigma_s = \begin{bmatrix} \langle x_s\cdot x_s \rangle & \langle x_s\cdot x_s^{\prime} \rangle \\ \langle x_s\cdot x_s^{\prime} \rangle & \langle x_s^{\prime}\cdot x_s^{\prime} \rangle \end{bmatrix} = \begin{bmatrix} \sigma_{s,11} & \sigma_{s,12} \\ \sigma_{s,21} & \sigma_{s,22} \end{bmatrix}$$

The final beam matrix $\Sigma_s$ can be calculated from the original beam matrix $\Sigma$ by doing matrix multiplications with the beam line transfer matrix $R$:

$\Sigma_s = R\Sigma R^T$

Where $R^T$ is the transpose of $R$.

Now, focusing on the (1,1) element of the final beam matrix throughout the matrix multiplications, we get the equation:

$\sigma_{s,11} = r_{11}^2\sigma_{11} + 2 r_{11}r_{12}\sigma_{12} + r_{12}^2\sigma_{22}$

Here the middle term has a factor of 2 because $\sigma_{12} = \sigma_{21}$.

Now divide both sides of the above equation by $r_{12}^2$, the equation becomes:

$\frac{\sigma_{s,11}}{r_{12}^2}=\frac{r_{11}^2}{r_{12}^2}\sigma_{11} + 2\frac{r_{11}}{r_{12}}\sigma_{12}+\sigma_{22}$

Which is a quadratic equation of the variable $\frac{r_{11}}{r_{12}}$. Since the RMS emittance RMS is defined to be the following.

$\varepsilon_{\text{RMS}} = \sqrt{\langle x^2 \rangle \langle x^{\prime 2} \rangle - \langle x \cdot x^\prime \rangle^2}$

The RMS emittance of the original beam can be calculated using its beam matrix elements:

$\varepsilon_{\text{RMS}} = \sqrt{\sigma_{11}\sigma_{22} - \sigma_{12}^2}$

To obtain the emittance measurement, the following procedure is employed:

1. For each value (or value combination) of the quadrupole(s), the beam line transfer matrix $R$ is calculated to determine values of $r_{11}$ and $r_{12}$.
2. The beam propagates through the varied beam line, and is observed at the monitor screen, where the beam size $\sigma_{s,11}$ is measured.
3. Repeat step 1 and 2 to obtain a series of values for $\frac{\sigma_{s,11}}{r_{12}^2}$ and $\frac{r_{11}}{r_{12}}$, fit the results with a parabola $\frac{\sigma_{s,11}}{r_{12}^2} = A\left(\frac{r_{11}}{r_{12}}\right)^2 + B\left(\frac{r_{11}}{r_{12}}\right) + C$.
4. Equate parabola fit parameters with original beam matrix elements: $A = \sigma_{11}$, $B = 2\sigma_{12}$, $C = \sigma_{22}$.
5. Calculate RMS emittance of the original beam: $\varepsilon_{\text{RMS}} = \sqrt{\sigma_{11}\sigma_{22} - \sigma_{12}^2}$

If the length of the quadrupole is short compared to its focal length $f = 1/K$, where $K$ is the field strength of the quadrupole, its transfer matrix $Q$ can be approximated by the thin lens approximation:

$$Q = \begin{pmatrix} 1 & 0 \\ K & 1 \end{pmatrix}$$

Then the RMS emittance can be calculated by fitting a parabola to values of measured beam size $\sigma_x^2$ versus quadrupole strength $K$.

By adding additional quadrupoles, this technique can be extended to a full 4-D reconstruction.

=== Mask-based reconstruction ===
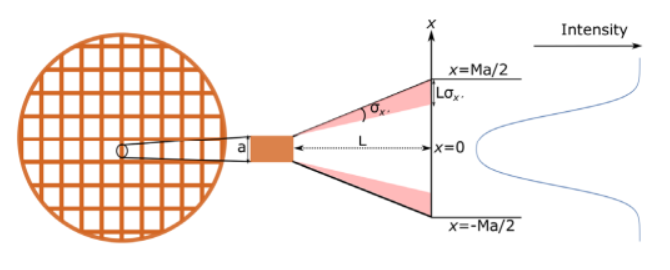
A schematic of mask based reconstruction. A charged particle beam is blocked by a grid and the profile is analyzed at a screen to the right.

Another fundamental method for measuring emittance is by using a predefined mask to imprint a pattern on the beam and sample the remaining beam at a screen downstream. Two such masks are pepper pots and TEM grids. A schematic of the TEM grid measurement is shown below.

By using the knowledge of the spacing of the features in the mask one can extract information about the beam size at the mask plane. By measuring the spacing between the same features on the sampled beam downstream, one can extract information about the angles in the beam. The quantities of merit can be extracted as described in Marx et al.

The choice of mask is generally dependent on the charge of the beam; low-charge beams are better suited to the TEM grid mask over the pepper pot, as more of the beam is transmitted.

== Emittance of electrons versus heavy particles ==
To understand why the RMS emittance takes on a particular value in a storage ring, one needs to distinguish between electron storage rings and storage rings with heavier particles (such as protons). In an electron storage ring, radiation is an important effect, whereas when other particles are stored, it is typically a small effect. When radiation is important, the particles undergo radiation damping (which slowly decreases emittance turn after turn) and diffusion driven by the quantum fluctuations of synchrotron radiation, leading to an equilibrium emittance. When no radiation is present, the emittances remain constant (apart from impedance effects and intrabeam scattering). In this case, the emittance is determined by the initial particle distribution. In particular if one injects a "small" emittance, it remains small, whereas if one injects a "large" emittance, it remains large.

== Acceptance ==
The acceptance, also called admittance, is the maximum emittance that a beam transport system or analyzing system is able to transmit. This is the size of the chamber transformed into phase space and does not suffer from the ambiguities of the definition of beam emittance.

== Conservation of emittance ==
Lenses can focus a beam, reducing its size in one transverse dimension while increasing its angular spread, but cannot change the total emittance. This is a result of Liouville's theorem. Ways of reducing the beam emittance include radiation damping, stochastic cooling, and electron cooling.

== Emittance and brightness ==
Emittance is also related to the brightness of the beam. In microscopy brightness is very often used, because it includes the current in the beam and most systems are circularly symmetric. Consider the brightness of the incident beam at the sample,

$B = \frac{I}{\lambda \varepsilon}$

where $I$ indicates the beam current and $\varepsilon$ represents the total emittance of the incident beam and $\lambda$ the wavelength of the incident electron.

The intrinsic emittance $\varepsilon_i$, describing a normal distribution in the initial phase space, is diffused by the emittance introduced by aberrations $\varepsilon_\chi$. The total emittance is approximately the sum in quadrature. Under the assumption of uniform illumination of the aperture with current per unit angle $J$, we have the following emittance-brightness relation,

$B = \frac{J \pi \alpha_0^2}{\lambda \sqrt{\varepsilon_i^2 + \varepsilon_\chi^2}}$

== See also ==
- Accelerator physics
- Etendue
- Mean transverse energy
