= Quantum fluctuations of synchrotron radiation =

Physical phenomenon

In circular accelerators and storage rings, electrons emit synchrotron radiation in discrete photons, introducing quantum fluctuations into their motion. This discreteness causes the particles to undergo a random walk in energy and momentum space, leading to a diffusion process that shapes the energy spread of the beam and its emittance.

== Mechanism ==
An electron moving through a magnetic field emits radiation called synchrotron radiation. The expected amount of radiation can be calculated using the classical power. Considering quantum mechanics, however, this radiation is emitted in discrete packets of photons. For this description, the distribution of the number of emitted photons and also the energy spectrum for the electron should be determined instead.

In particular, the normalized power spectrum emitted by a charged particle moving in a bending magnet is given by

$$S(\xi)=\frac{9\sqrt{3}}{8\pi}\xi\int_\xi^\infty K_{5/3}(\bar \xi) d\bar \xi.$$

This result was originally derived by Dmitri Ivanenko and Arseny Sokolov and independently by Julian Schwinger in 1949.

Dividing each power of this power spectrum by the energy yields the photon flux:

$$F(\xi)=\frac{1}{\xi}S(\xi)=\frac{9\sqrt{3}}{8\pi}\int_\xi^\infty K_{5/3}(\bar \xi) d\bar \xi.$$

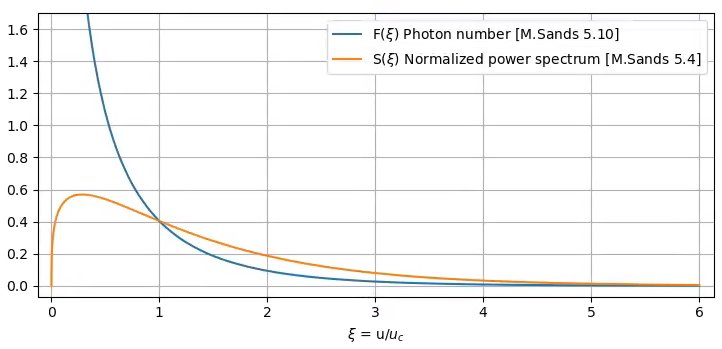

The photon flux from this normalized power spectrum (of all energies) is then

$$\dot N_{norm} =\frac{9\sqrt{3}}{8\pi}\int_{\xi=0}^\infty\int_{\bar \xi=\xi}^\infty K_{5/3}(\bar \xi) d\bar \xi d\xi  = \Gamma(11/6)\Gamma(1/6)\frac{9\sqrt{3}}{8\pi} = \frac{15\sqrt{3}}{8}.$$

The fact that the above photon flux integral is finite implies discrete photon emission. It is a Poisson process. The emission rate is

$$r_{\gamma} = \frac{5\sqrt{3}}{6} \frac{r_e e_0 \beta^4 \gamma }{ \hbar|\rho| } \text{ photons/sec}.$$

For a travelled distance $\Delta s$ at a speed close to $c$ ($\beta \approx 1$), the average number of emitted photons by the particle can be expressed as

$$\langle n_{\gamma} \rangle = \frac{5\sqrt{3}}{6} \frac{r_e e_0 \gamma }{ \hbar|\rho| } \frac{\Delta s}{c} = \frac{5\sqrt{3}}{6} \frac{\alpha \gamma }{ |\rho| }\Delta s,$$

where $\alpha$ is the fine-structure constant. The probability that k photons are emitted over $\Delta s$ is

$$Pr \left( n_{\gamma} = k \right) = \frac{\langle n_{\gamma} \rangle^k}{k!} e^{-\langle n_{\gamma} \rangle}.$$

The photon number curve and the power spectrum curve intersect at the critical energy

$$u_c=\frac{3c\hbar\gamma^3}{2\rho},$$

where γ = E/e_{0}, E is the total energy of the charged particle, ρ is the radius of curvature, r_{e} the classical electron radius, e_{0} = m_{e}c^{2} the particle rest mass energy, ℏ the reduced Planck constant, and c the speed of light.

The mean of the quantum energy is given by $\langle u\rangle = \frac{8}{15\sqrt{3}}u_c$ and impacts mainly the radiation damping. However, the particle motion perturbation (diffusion) is mainly related by the variance of the quantum energy $\langle u^2\rangle$ and leads to an equilibrium emittance. The diffusion coefficient at a given position s is given by

$d(s) = \frac{55}{48\sqrt{3}}\alpha \left(\frac{\hbar}{m_e c}\right)^2 \frac{\gamma^5}{|\rho(s)|^3}.$
