= Synchrotron function =

First and second Synchrotron functions.

In mathematics the synchrotron functions are defined as follows (for x ≥ 0):

- First synchrotron function
  $$F(x) = x \int_x^\infty  K_{\frac{5}{3}}(t)\,dt$$
- Second synchrotron function
  $$G(x) = x K_{\frac{2}{3}}(x)$$

where K_{j} is the modified Bessel function of the second kind.

== Use in astrophysics ==
In astrophysics, x is usually a ratio of frequencies, that is, the frequency over a critical frequency (critical frequency is the frequency at which most synchrotron radiation is radiated). This is needed when calculating the spectra for different types of synchrotron emission. It takes a spectrum of electrons (or any charged particle) generated by a separate process (such as a power law distribution of electrons and positrons from a constant injection spectrum) and converts this to the spectrum of photons generated by the input electrons/positrons.
