= Photoinjector =

Source for electron beams which works via the photoelectric effect

A photoinjector is a type of source for intense electron beams which relies on the photoelectric effect. A laser pulse incident onto the cathode of a photoinjector drives electrons out of it, and into the accelerating field of the electron gun. In comparison with the widespread thermionic electron gun, photoinjectors produce electron beams of higher brightness, which means more particles packed into smaller volume of phase space (beam emittance). Photoinjectors serve as the main electron source for single-pass synchrotron light sources, such as free-electron lasers and for ultrafast electron diffraction setups. The first RF photoinjector was developed in 1985 at Los Alamos National Laboratory and used as the source for a free-electron-laser experiment. High-brightness electron beams produced by photoinjectors are used directly or indirectly to probe the molecular, atomic and nuclear structure of matter for fundamental research, as well as material characterization.

A photoinjector comprises a photocathode, electron gun (AC or DC), power supplies, driving laser system, timing and synchronization system, emittance compensation magnets. It can include vacuum system and cathode fabrication or transport system. It is usually followed by beam diagnostics and higher-energy accelerators.

Animation showing how an AC linear accelerator works. For a photoinjector, the source S is the cathode inside the fractional cell, followed by four booster cells of RF field.

The key component of a photoinjector is a photocathode, which is located inside the cavity of electron gun (usually, a 0.6-fractional cell for optimal distribution of accelerating field). Extracted electron beam suffers from its own space-charge fields that deteriorate the beam brightness. For that reason, photoelectron guns often have one or more full-size booster cells to increase the beam energy and reduce the space-charge effect. The gun's accelerating field is RF (radio-frequency) wave provided by a klystron or other RF power source. For low-energy beams, such as ones used in electron diffraction and microscopy, electrostatic acceleration (DC) is suitable.

The photoemission on the cathode is initiated by an incident pulse from the driving laser. Depending on the material of the photocathode, the laser wavelength can vary from 1700 nm (infrared) down to 100-200 nm (ultraviolet). Emission from the cavity wall is possible with laser wavelength of about 250 nm for copper walls or cathodes. Semiconductor cathodes are often sensitive to ambient conditions and might require a clean preparation chamber located behind the photoelectron gun. The optical system of the driving laser is often designed to control the pulse structure, and consequently, the distribution of electrons in the extracted bunch. For example, a fs-scale laser pulse with an elliptical transverse profile creates a thin "pancake" electron bunch, that evolves into a uniformly filled ellipsoid under its own space-charge fields. A more sophisticated laser pulse with a comb-like longitudinal profile generates a similarly shaped, comb electron beam.
