= Self-energy =

Energy quantum particles contribute to themselves

In quantum field theory, self-energy $\Sigma$ is the energy of a particle due to the interaction with its own field. In electrostatics, an electron is never really free. It is always interacting with its own electric field, independent of the environment it is in. In condensed matter physics, self-energy creates quasiparticles and gives them a lifetime. Self-energy is especially used to describe electron-electron interactions in Fermi liquids. Another example of self-energy is found in the context of phonon softening due to electron-phonon coupling.

== Characteristics ==
Mathematically, this energy is equal to the so-called on mass shell value of the proper self-energy operator (or proper mass operator) in the momentum-energy representation (more precisely, to $\hbar$ times this value). In this, or other representations (such as the space-time representation), the self-energy is pictorially (and economically) represented by means of Feynman diagrams, such as the one shown below. In this particular diagram, the three arrowed straight lines represent particles, or particle propagators, and the wavy line a particle-particle interaction; removing (or amputating) the left-most and the right-most straight lines in the diagram shown below (these so-called external lines correspond to prescribed values for, for instance, momentum and energy, or four-momentum), one retains a contribution to the self-energy operator (in, for instance, the momentum-energy representation). Using a small number of simple rules, each Feynman diagram can be readily expressed in its corresponding algebraic form.

In general, the on-the-mass-shell value of the self-energy operator in the momentum-energy representation is complex. In such cases, it is the real part of this self-energy that is identified with the physical self-energy (referred to above as particle's "self-energy"); the inverse of the imaginary part is a measure for the lifetime of the particle under investigation. For clarity, elementary excitations, or dressed particles (see quasi-particle), in interacting systems are distinct from stable particles in vacuum; their state functions consist of complicated superpositions of the eigenstates of the underlying many-particle system, which only momentarily, if at all, behave like those specific to isolated particles; the above-mentioned lifetime is the time over which a dressed particle behaves as if it were a single particle with well-defined momentum and energy.

The self-energy operator (often denoted by $\Sigma_{}^{}$, and less frequently by $M_{}^{}$) is related to the bare and dressed propagators (often denoted by $G_0^{}$ and $G_{}^{}$ respectively) via the Dyson equation (named after Freeman Dyson):

$$G = G_0^{} + G_0 \Sigma G.$$

Multiplying on the left by the inverse $G_0^{-1}$ of the operator $G_0$ and on the right by $G^{-1}$ yields

$$\Sigma = G_0^{-1} - G^{-1}.$$

The photon and gluon do not get a mass through renormalization because gauge symmetry protects them from getting a mass. This is a consequence of the Ward identity. The W-boson and the Z-boson get their masses through the Higgs mechanism; they do undergo mass renormalization through the renormalization of the electroweak theory.

Neutral particles with internal quantum numbers can mix with each other through virtual pair production. The primary example of this phenomenon is the mixing of neutral kaons. Under appropriate simplifying assumptions this can be described without quantum field theory.

== Other uses ==
In chemistry, the self-energy or Born energy of an ion is the energy associated with the field of the ion itself.

In solid state and condensed-matter physics self-energies and a myriad of related quasiparticle properties are calculated by Green's function methods and Green's function (many-body theory) of interacting low-energy excitations on the basis of electronic band structure calculations. Self-energies also find extensive application in the calculation of particle transport through open quantum systems and the embedding of sub-regions into larger systems (for example the surface of a semi-infinite crystal).

== See also ==
- Quantum field theory
- QED vacuum
- Renormalization
- Self-force
- GW approximation
- Wheeler–Feynman absorber theory
