= Synchrotron radiation =

Electromagnetic radiation

Synchrotron radiation (also known as magnetobremsstrahlung) is the electromagnetic radiation emitted when relativistic charged particles are subject to an acceleration perpendicular to their velocity (a ⊥ v). It is produced artificially in some types of particle accelerators or naturally by fast electrons moving through magnetic fields. The radiation produced in this way has a characteristic polarization, and the frequencies generated can range over a large portion of the electromagnetic spectrum.

Pictorial representation of the radiation emission process by a source moving around a Schwarzschild black hole in a de Sitter universe.

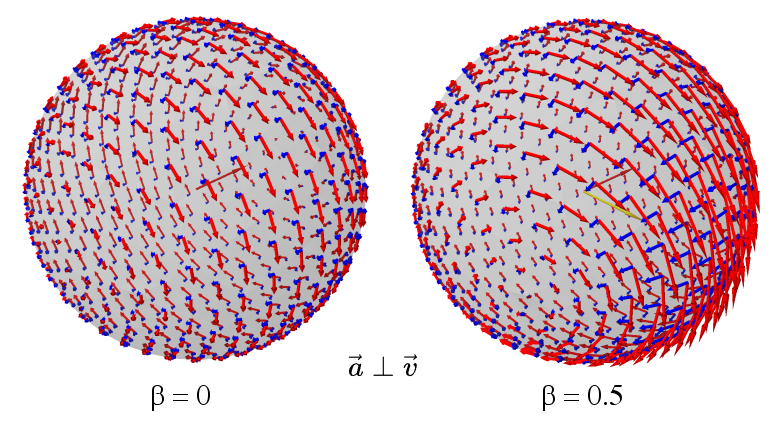
Electromagnetic field observed far from the source (in arbitrary unit) of a positive accelerated point charge. When the velocity increases, the radiation concentrates along the trajectory. This field can be calculated using Liénard–Wiechert potential.

Synchrotron radiation is similar to bremsstrahlung radiation, which is emitted by a charged particle when the acceleration is parallel to the direction of motion. The general term for radiation emitted by particles in a magnetic field is gyromagnetic radiation, for which synchrotron radiation is the ultra-relativistic special case. Radiation emitted by charged particles moving non-relativistically in a magnetic field is called cyclotron emission. For particles in the mildly relativistic range (≈85% of the speed of light), the emission is termed gyro-synchrotron radiation.

In astrophysics, synchrotron emission occurs, for instance, due to ultra-relativistic motion of a charged particle around a black hole. When the source follows a circular geodesic around the black hole, the synchrotron radiation occurs for orbits close to the photon sphere where the motion is in the ultra-relativistic regime.

Synchrotron radiation from a bending magnet

Synchrotron radiation from an undulator

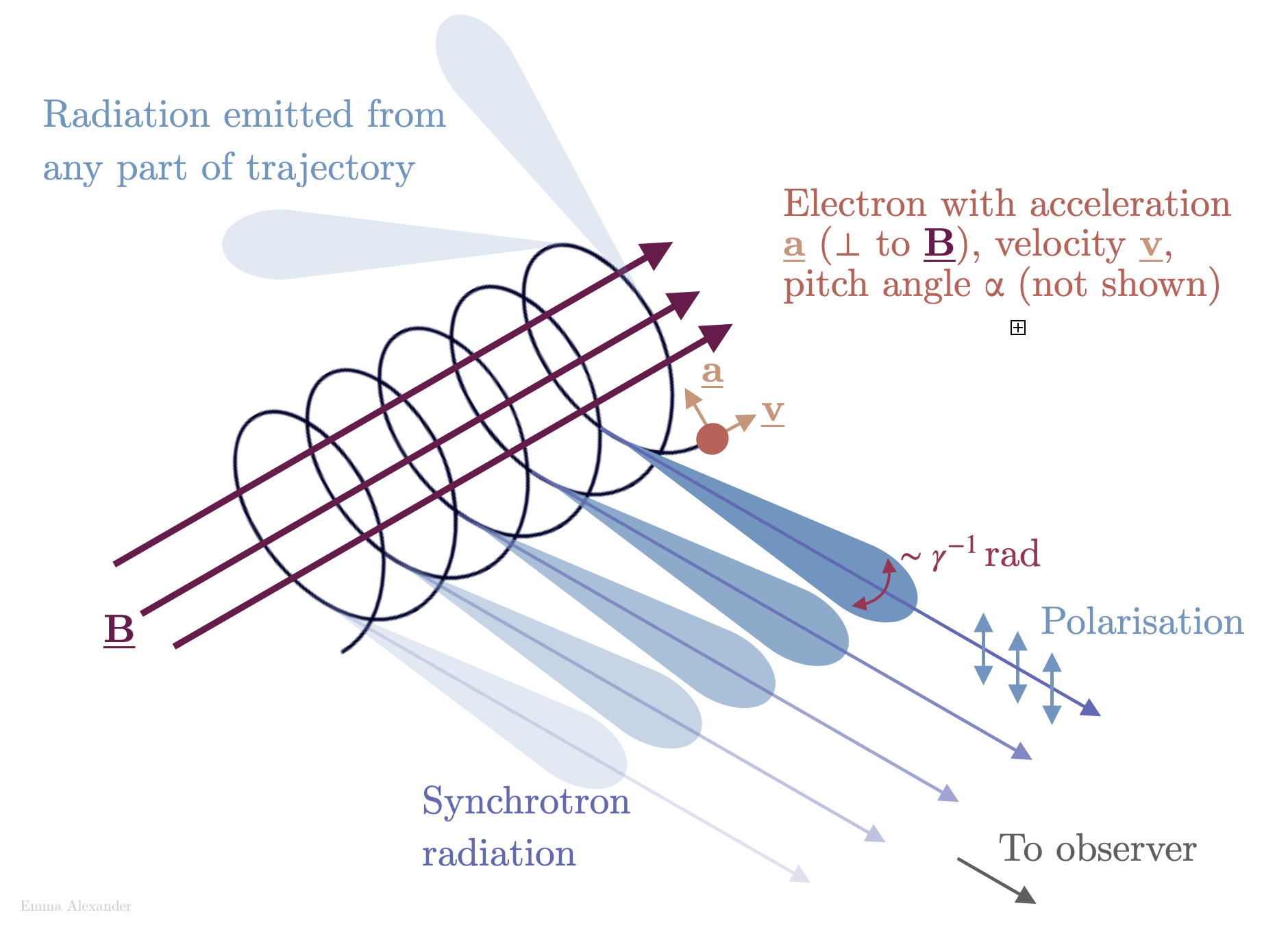
Synchrotron radiation from an astronomical source

== Types ==
Usually called synchrotron radiation, it can be divided into three types depending on the energy of electrons:

- Cyclotron radiation: non-relativistic electrons (γ ≈ 1).
- Gyrosynchrotron radiation or gyro-magnetic radiation: mildly relativistic electrons (γ ~ 2–10, kinetic energies of tens of keV up to a few MeV).
- Synchrotron radiation: relativistic electrons (γ ≫ 10, GeV and above for typical astrophysical fields).

== History ==
Synchrotron radiation was first observed by technician Floyd Haber, on April 24, 1947, at the 70 MeV electron synchrotron of the General Electric research laboratory in Schenectady, New York. While this was not the first synchrotron built, it was the first with a transparent vacuum tube, allowing the radiation to be directly observed.

As recounted by Herbert Pollock:

On April 24, Langmuir and I were running the machine and as usual were trying to push the electron gun and its associated pulse transformer to the limit. Some intermittent sparking had occurred and we asked the technician to observe with a mirror around the protective concrete wall. He immediately signaled to turn off the synchrotron as "he saw an arc in the tube". The vacuum was still excellent, so Langmuir and I came to the end of the wall and observed. At first we thought it might be due to Cherenkov radiation, but it soon became clearer that we were seeing Ivanenko and Pomeranchuk radiation.

== Historical timeline of major facilities ==
Timeline of major synchrotron facilities
Year	Facility	Location	Key Milestone
1947	General Electric 70 MeV	United States	First visual observation of radiation
1952	Birmingham Proton Synchrotron	United Kingdom	First proton synchrotron
1954	Bevatron	United States	Discovered the antiproton (1955)
1968	Tantalus	United States	First dedicated storage ring light source
1980	Synchrotron Radiation Source (SRS)	United Kingdom	First dedicated X-ray light source
1994	European Synchrotron Radiation Facility (ESRF)	France	World's first 3rd-generation source
2016	MAX IV	Sweden	World's first 4th-generation MBA source
2020	ESRF-EBS	France	First high-energy 4th-generation upgrade

== Description ==
A direct consequence of Maxwell's equations is that accelerated charged particles always emit electromagnetic radiation. Synchrotron radiation is the special case of charged particles moving at relativistic speed undergoing acceleration perpendicular to their direction of motion, typically in a magnetic field. In such a field, the force due to the field is always perpendicular to both the direction of motion and to the direction of field, as shown by the Lorentz force law.

The power carried by the radiation is found (in SI units) by the relativistic Larmor formula:

$$P_\gamma = \frac{q^2}{6 \pi \varepsilon_0 c^3} a^2 \gamma^4 = \frac{q^2 c}{6 \pi \varepsilon_0} \frac{\beta^4 \gamma^4}{\rho^2} ,$$
where

- $\varepsilon_0$ is the vacuum permittivity,
- $q$ is the particle charge,
- $a$ is the magnitude of the acceleration,
- $c$ is the speed of light,
- $\gamma$ is the Lorentz factor,
- $\beta = v/c$,
- $\rho$ is the radius of curvature of the particle trajectory.

The force on the emitting electron is given by the Abraham–Lorentz–Dirac force.

As a summary, synchrotron radiation is exactly the Doppler-shifted version of Larmor radiation according to the movement of the accelerated electrons.

When the radiation is emitted by a particle moving in a plane, the radiation is linearly polarized when observed in that plane, and circularly polarized when observed at a small angle. However, in quantum mechanics, this radiation is emitted in discrete packets of photons, which introduces quantum fluctuations in the emitted radiation and the particle's trajectory. For a given acceleration, the average energy of emitted photons is proportional to $\gamma^3$ and the emission rate to $\gamma$.

== From accelerators ==
Circular accelerators will always produce gyromagnetic radiation as the particles are deflected in the magnetic field. However, the quantity and properties of the radiation are highly dependent on the nature of the acceleration taking place. For example, due to the difference in mass, the factor of $\gamma^4$ in the formula for the emitted power means that electrons radiate energy at approximately 10^{13} times the rate of protons.

Energy loss from synchrotron radiation in circular accelerators was originally considered a nuisance, as additional energy must be supplied to the beam in order to offset the losses. However, beginning in the 1980s, circular electron accelerators known as light sources have been constructed to deliberately produce intense beams of synchrotron radiation for research.

== In astronomy ==
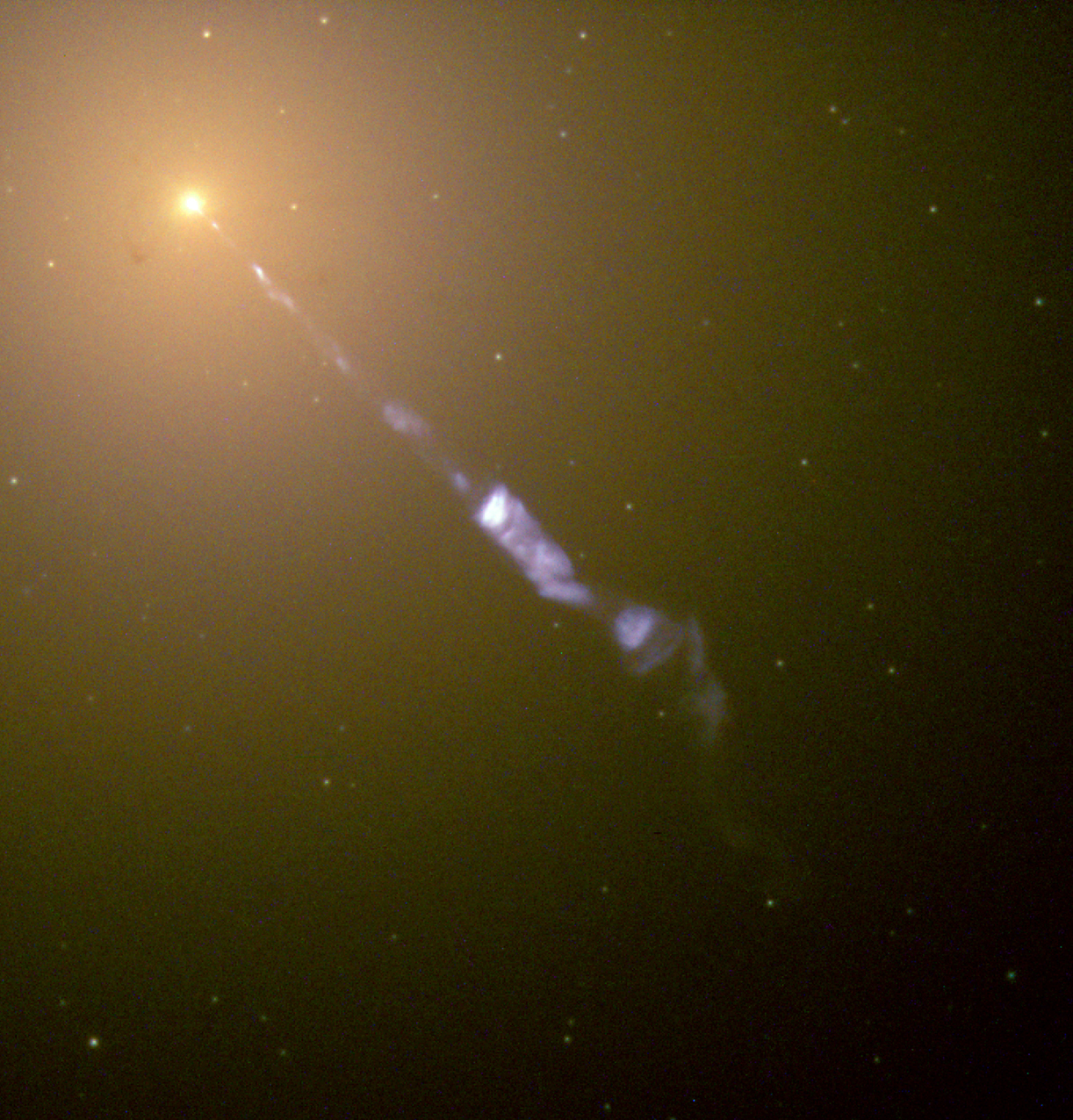
Messier 87's astrophysical jet, HST image. The blue light from the jet emerging from the bright AGN core, towards the lower right, is due to synchrotron radiation.

Synchrotron radiation is also generated by astronomical objects, typically where relativistic electrons spiral (and hence change velocity) through magnetic fields. Two of its characteristics include power-law energy spectra and polarization. It is considered to be one of the most powerful tools in the study of extra-solar magnetic fields wherever relativistic charged particles are present. Most known cosmic radio sources emit synchrotron radiation. It is often used to estimate the strength of large cosmic magnetic fields as well as analyze the contents of the interstellar and intergalactic media.

=== History of detection ===
This type of radiation was first detected in the Crab Nebula in 1956 by Jan Hendrik Oort and Theodore Walraven, and a few months later in a jet emitted by Messier 87 by Geoffrey R. Burbidge. It was confirmation of a prediction by Iosif S. Shklovsky in 1953. However, it had been predicted earlier (1950) by Hannes Alfvén and Nicolai Herlofson. Solar flares accelerate particles that emit in this way, as suggested by R. Giovanelli in 1948 and described by J.H. Piddington in 1952.

T. K. Breus noted that questions of priority on the history of astrophysical synchrotron radiation are complicated, writing:

In particular, the Russian physicist V.L. Ginzburg broke his relationships with I.S. Shklovsky and did not speak with him for 18 years. In the West, Thomas Gold and Sir Fred Hoyle were in dispute with H. Alfven and N. Herlofson, while K.O. Kiepenheuer and G. Hutchinson were ignored by them.

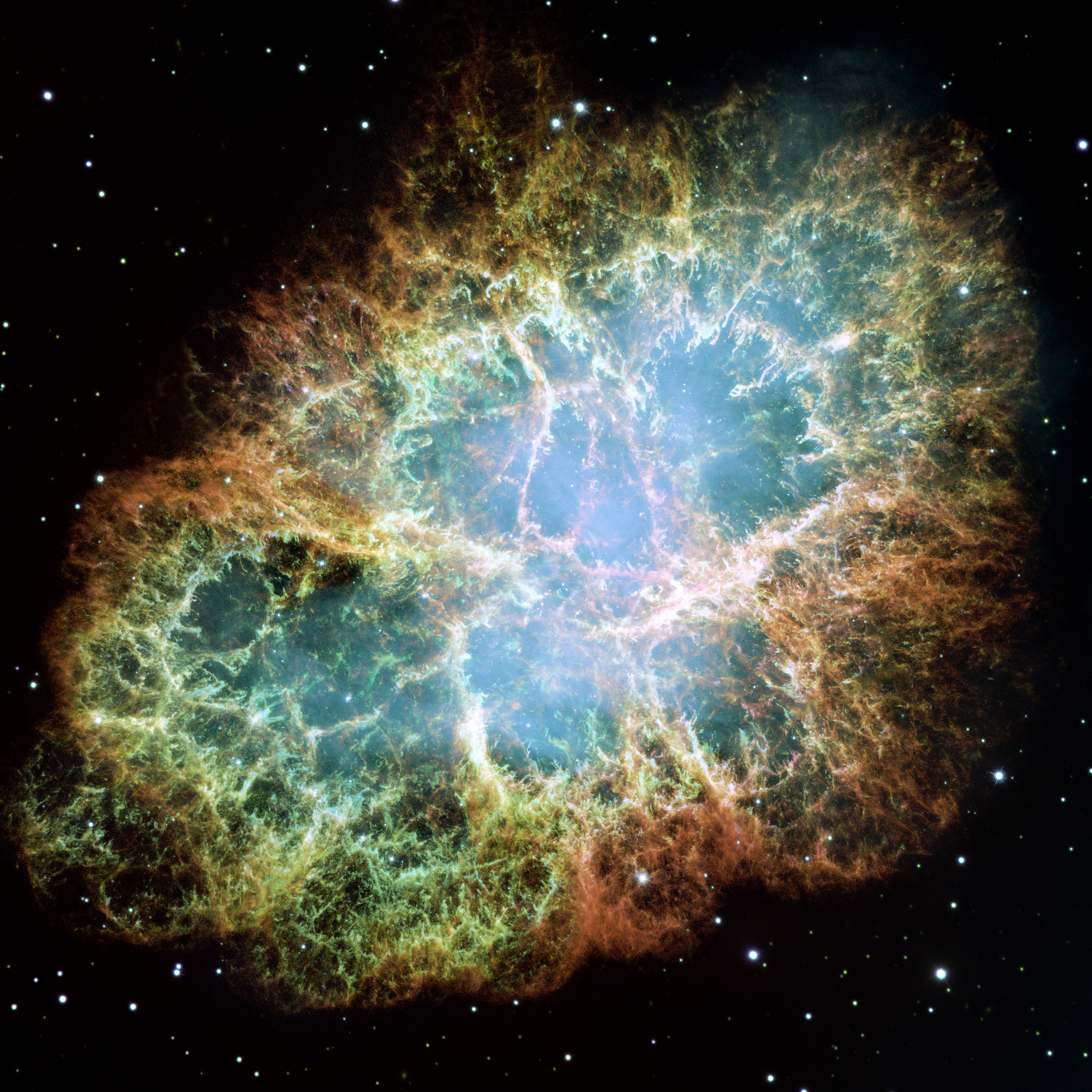
The bluish glow from the central region of the Crab Nebula is due to synchrotron radiation.

=== From supermassive black holes ===
It has been suggested that supermassive black holes produce synchrotron radiation in "jets", generated by the gravitational acceleration of ions in their polar magnetic fields. The nearest such observed jet is from the core of the galaxy Messier 87. This jet is interesting for producing the illusion of superluminal motion as observed from the frame of Earth. This phenomenon is caused because the jets are traveling very near the speed of light and at a very small angle towards the observer. Because at every point of their path the high-velocity jets are emitting light, the light they emit does not approach the observer much more quickly than the jet itself. Light emitted over hundreds of years of travel thus arrives at the observer over a much smaller time period, giving the illusion of faster than light travel, despite the fact that there is actually no violation of special relativity.

=== Pulsar wind nebulae ===
A class of astronomical sources where synchrotron emission is important is pulsar wind nebulae, also known as plerions, of which the Crab Nebula and its associated pulsar are archetypal. Pulsed emission gamma-ray radiation from the Crab has recently been observed up to ≥25 GeV, probably due to synchrotron emission by electrons trapped in the strong magnetic field around the pulsar. Polarization in the Crab Nebula at energies from 0.1 to 1.0 MeV, illustrates this typical property of synchrotron radiation.

=== Interstellar and intergalactic media ===
Much of what is known about the magnetic environment of the interstellar medium and intergalactic medium is derived from observations of synchrotron radiation. Cosmic ray electrons moving through the medium interact with relativistic plasma and emit synchrotron radiation which is detected on Earth. The properties of the radiation allow astronomers to make inferences about the magnetic field strength and orientation in these regions. However, accurate calculations of field strength cannot be made without knowing the relativistic electron density.

=== In supernovae ===
When a star explodes in a supernova, the fastest ejecta move at semi-relativistic speeds approximately 10% the speed of light. This blast wave gyrates electrons in ambient magnetic fields and generates synchrotron emission, revealing the radius of the blast wave at the location of the emission. Synchrotron emission can also reveal the strength of the magnetic field at the front of the shock wave, as well as the circumstellar density it encounters, but strongly depends on the choice of energy partition between the magnetic field, proton kinetic energy, and electron kinetic energy. Radio synchrotron emission has allowed astronomers to shed light on mass loss and stellar winds that occur just prior to stellar death.

== See also ==
- Bremsstrahlung – Electromagnetic radiation due to deceleration of charged particles
- Cyclotron turnover
- Cyclotron radiation – Radiation emitted by charged particles deflected by magnetic field
- Free-electron laser – Laser using electron beam in vacuum as gain medium
- Radiation reaction – Recoil force on accelerating charged particle
- Relativistic beaming – Change in luminosity of a moving object due to special relativity
- Sokolov–Ternov effect – Physical phenomenon of spin-polarization
- Synchrotron function
