= Mean transverse energy =

Accelerator physics energy quantity

In accelerator physics, the mean transverse energy (MTE) is a quantity that describes the variance of the transverse momentum of a beam. While the quantity has a defined value for any particle beam, it is generally used in the context of photoinjectors for electron beams.

== Definition ==
For a beam consisting of $N$ particles with momenta $\mathbf{p_{i}}$ and mass $m$ traveling prominently in the $\hat{n}$ direction the mean transverse energy is given by

$$\text{MTE} = \frac{1}{N} \sum_{i} \frac{ \mathbf{p^{2}_{i,\perp}} }{2m}$$

Where $\mathbf{p_{\perp}}$ is the component of the momentum $\mathbf{p_{i}}$ perpendicular to the beam axis $\hat{n}$. For a continuous, normalized distribution of particles $f(\mathbf{p_{\perp}}, \mathbf{p_\parallel})$ the MTE is

$$\text{MTE} = \int \frac{ \mathbf{p^{2}_{\perp}} }{2m} f(\mathbf{p_{\perp}}, \mathbf{p_\parallel}) \,dp_{\parallel} \,d^{2}p_{\perp}$$

== Relation to Other Quantities ==
Emittance is a common quantity in beam physics which describes the volume of a beam in phase space, and is normally conserved through typical linear beam transformations; for example, one may transition from a beam with a large spatial size and a small momentum spread to one with a small spatial size and a large momentum spread, both cases retaining the same emittance. Due to its conservation, the emittance at the species source (e.g., photocathode for electrons) is the lower limit on attainable emittance.

For a beam born with a spatial size $\sigma_x$ and a 1-D MTE the minimum 2-D ($x$ and $p_x$) emittance is

$$\varepsilon = \sigma_x \sqrt{\frac{ \text{MTE} }{mc^2}}$$

The emittance of each dimension may be multiplied together to get the higher dimensional emittance. For a photocathode the spatial size of the beam is typically equal to the spatial size of the ionizing laser beam and the MTE may depend on several factors involving the cathode, the laser, and the extraction field. Due to the linear independence of the laser spot size and the MTE, the beam size is often factored out, formulating the 1-D thermal emittance

$$\varepsilon_{\text{th}} = \sqrt{\frac{\text{MTE}}{m_ec^2}}$$

Likewise, the maximum brightness, or phase space density, is given by

$$B_{n,4D} = \frac{m_0 c^2 \epsilon_0 E_0}{2\pi MTE}$$
