= Wheeler–Feynman absorber theory =

Interpretation of electrodynamics

The Wheeler–Feynman absorber theory (also called the Wheeler–Feynman time-symmetric theory), named after its originators, the physicists Richard Feynman and John Archibald Wheeler, is a theory of electrodynamics based on a relativistically correct extension of action at a distance electron particles. The theory postulates no independent electromagnetic field. Rather, the whole theory is encapsulated by the Lorentz-invariant action $S$ of particle trajectories $z^\mu_a(\tau_a),\,\, z^\mu_b(\tau_b) \cdots$ defined as

$S = -\sum_{a<b} \Bigg(m_a \int\limits_{[\gamma_a]} \sqrt{\mathrm dz_{\mu,a} \mathrm dz^\mu_a} + q_aq_b \int\limits_{[\gamma_a\times \gamma_b]} \mathrm dz_{\nu, a} \mathrm dz^\nu_b\ \delta((z_a-z_b)_\mu(z_a-z_b)^\mu) \Bigg),$

where $c = 1.$

The absorber theory is invariant under time-reversal transformation, consistent with the lack of any physical basis for microscopic time-reversal symmetry breaking. Another key principle resulting from this interpretation, and somewhat reminiscent of Mach's principle and the work of Hugo Tetrode, is that elementary particles are not self-interacting. This immediately removes the problem of electron self-energy giving an infinity in the energy of an electromagnetic field.

== Motivation ==
Wheeler and Feynman begin by observing that classical electromagnetic field theory was designed before the discovery of electrons: charge is a continuous substance in the theory. An electron particle does not naturally fit in to the theory: should a point charge see the effect of its own field? They reconsider the fundamental problem of a collection of point charges, taking up a field-free action at a distance theory developed separately by Karl Schwarzschild, Hugo Tetrode, and Adriaan Fokker. Unlike instantaneous action at a distance theories of the early 1800s these "direct interaction" theories are based on interaction propagation at the speed of light. They differ from the classical field theory in three ways 1) no independent field is postulated; 2) the point charges do not act upon themselves; 3) the equations are time symmetric. Wheeler and Feynman propose to develop these equations into a relativistically correct generalization of electromagnetism based on Newtonian mechanics.

Wheeler and Feynman talked about the theory at a meeting of the American Physical Society during February 21 and 22, 1941. After that, Einstein told them of previous papers of Tetrode and Ritz. Ritz in 1908 had argued that the advanced solutions to the Maxwell electromagnetic equations are unphysical, and only retarded solutions can be admitted. This was the impetus for his ballistic theory. Tetrode in 1922 proposed that electromagnetic interactions are direct, time-symmetric actions between particles along lightlike intervals, not mediated by independent fields. An isolated charge does not radiate, because radiation is an interaction between an emitting particle and an absorbing particle.

== Problems with previous direct-interaction theories ==
The Tetrode-Fokker work left unsolved two major problems. First, in a non-instantaneous action at a distance theory, the equal action-reaction of Newton's laws of motion conflicts with causality. If an action propagates forward in time, the reaction would necessarily propagate backwards in time. Second, in their presentation Wheeler and Feynman had exercised an option available in direct-interaction theories to explicitly exclude self-action, whereas existing explanations of radiation reaction force or radiation resistance depended upon accelerating electrons interacting with their own field. (Feynman's subsequent work in quantum theory employed self-action however).

== Absorber and radiation resistance ==
Wheeler and Feynman postulate the "universe" of all other electrons as an absorber of radiation to overcome these issues and extend the direct interaction theories. Rather than considering an unphysical isolated point charge, they model all charges in the universe with a uniform absorber in a shell around a charge. As the charge moves relative to the absorber, it radiates into the absorber which "pushes back", causing the radiation resistance.

== Key result ==
Feynman and Wheeler obtained their result in a very simple and elegant way. They considered all the charged particles (emitters) present in our universe and assumed all of them to generate time-reversal symmetric waves. The resulting field is

$$E_\text{tot}(\mathbf{x}, t) =
\sum_n \frac{E_n^\text{ret}(\mathbf{x}, t) + E_n^\text{adv}(\mathbf{x}, t)}{2}.$$

Then they observed that if the relation

$$E_\text{free}(\mathbf{x}, t) =
\sum_n \frac{E_n^\text{ret}(\mathbf{x}, t) - E_n^\text{adv}(\mathbf{x}, t)}{2} = 0$$

holds, then $E_\text{free}$, being a solution of the homogeneous Maxwell equation, can be used to obtain the total field

$$E_\text{tot}(\mathbf{x}, t) =
\sum_n \frac{E_n^\text{ret}(\mathbf{x}, t) + E_n^\text{adv}(\mathbf{x}, t)}{2} +
\sum_n \frac{E_n^\text{ret}(\mathbf{x}, t) - E_n^\text{adv}(\mathbf{x}, t)}{2} =
\sum_n E_n^\text{ret}(\mathbf{x}, t).$$

The total field is then the observed pure retarded field.

The assumption that the free field is identically zero is the core of the absorber idea. It means that the radiation emitted by each particle is completely absorbed by all other particles present in the universe. To better understand this point, it may be useful to consider how the absorption mechanism works in common materials. At the microscopic scale, it results from the sum of the incoming electromagnetic wave and the waves generated from the electrons of the material, which react to the external perturbation. If the incoming wave is absorbed, the result is a zero outgoing field. In the absorber theory the same concept is used, however, in presence of both retarded and advanced waves.

== Arrow of time ambiguity ==
The resulting wave appears to have a preferred time direction, because it respects causality. However, this is only an illusion. Indeed, it is always possible to reverse the time direction by simply exchanging the labels emitter and absorber. Thus, the apparently preferred time direction results from the arbitrary labelling. Wheeler and Feynman claimed that thermodynamics picked the observed direction; cosmological selections have also been proposed.

The requirement of time-reversal symmetry, in general, is difficult to reconcile with the principle of causality. Maxwell's equations and the equations for electromagnetic waves have, in general, two possible solutions: a retarded (delayed) solution and an advanced one. Accordingly, any charged particle generates waves, say at time $t_0 = 0$ and point $x_0 = 0$, which will arrive at point $x_1$ at the instant $t_1 = x_1/c$ (here $c$ is the speed of light), after the emission (retarded solution), and other waves, which will arrive at the same place at the instant $t_2 = -x_1/c$, before the emission (advanced solution). The latter, however, violates the causality principle: advanced waves could be detected before their emission. Thus the advanced solutions are usually discarded in the interpretation of electromagnetic waves.

In the absorber theory, instead charged particles are considered as both emitters and absorbers, and the emission process is connected with the absorption process as follows: Both the retarded waves from emitter to absorber and the advanced waves from absorber to emitter are considered. The sum of the two, however, results in causal waves, although the anti-causal (advanced) solutions are not discarded a priori.

Alternatively, the way that Wheeler/Feynman came up with the primary equation is: They assumed that their Lagrangian only interacted when and where the fields for the individual particles were separated by a proper time of zero. So since only massless particles propagate from emission to detection with zero proper time separation, this Lagrangian automatically demands an electromagnetic like interaction.

== New interpretation of radiation damping ==
One of the major results of the absorber theory is the elegant and clear interpretation of the electromagnetic radiation process. A charged particle that experiences acceleration is known to emit electromagnetic waves, i.e., to lose energy. Thus, the Newtonian equation for the particle ($F = ma$) must contain a dissipative force (damping term), which takes into account this energy loss. In the causal interpretation of electromagnetism, Hendrik Lorentz and Max Abraham proposed that such a force, later called Abraham–Lorentz force, is due to the retarded self-interaction of the particle with its own field. This first interpretation, however, is not completely satisfactory, as it leads to divergences in the theory and needs some assumptions on the structure of charge distribution of the particle. Paul Dirac generalized the formula to make it relativistically invariant. While doing so, he also suggested a different interpretation. He showed that the damping term can be expressed in terms of a free field acting on the particle at its own position:

$$E^\text{damping}(\mathbf{x}_j, t) = \frac{E_j^\text{ret}(\mathbf{x}_j, t) - E_j^\text{adv}(\mathbf{x}_j, t)}{2}.$$

However, Dirac did not propose any physical explanation of this interpretation.

A clear and simple explanation can instead be obtained in the framework of absorber theory, starting from the simple idea that each particle does not interact with itself. This is actually the opposite of the first Abraham–Lorentz proposal. The field acting on the particle $j$ at its own position (the point $x_j$) is then

$$E^\text{tot}(\mathbf{x}_j, t) =
\sum_{n \neq j} \frac{E_n^\text{ret}(\mathbf{x}_j, t) + E_n^\text{adv}(\mathbf{x}_j, t)}{2}.$$

If we sum the free-field term of this expression, we obtain

$$E^\text{tot}(\mathbf{x}_j, t) =
\sum_{n \neq j} \frac{E_n^\text{ret}(\mathbf{x}_j, t) + E_n^\text{adv}(\mathbf{x}_j, t)}{2} +
\sum_n \frac{E_n^\text{ret}(\mathbf{x}_j, t) - E_n^\text{adv}(\mathbf{x}_j, t)}{2}$$

and, thanks to Dirac's result,

$$E^\text{tot}(\mathbf{x}_j, t) =
\sum_{n \neq j} E_n^\text{ret}(\mathbf{x}_j, t) + E^\text{damping}(\mathbf{x}_j, t).$$

Thus, the damping force is obtained without the need for self-interaction, which is known to lead to divergences, and also giving a physical justification to the expression derived by Dirac.

== Developments since original formulation ==
=== Gravity theory ===
Inspired by the Machian nature of the Wheeler–Feynman absorber theory for electrodynamics, Fred Hoyle and Jayant Narlikar proposed their own theory of gravity in the context of general relativity. This model still exists in spite of recent astronomical observations that have challenged the theory. Stephen Hawking had criticized the original Hoyle-Narlikar theory believing that the advanced waves going off to infinity would lead to a divergence, as indeed they would, if the universe were only expanding.

=== Transactional interpretation of quantum mechanics ===
Again inspired by the Wheeler–Feynman absorber theory, the transactional interpretation of quantum mechanics (TIQM) first proposed in 1986 by John G. Cramer, describes quantum interactions in terms of a standing wave formed by retarded (forward-in-time) and advanced (backward-in-time) waves. Cramer claims it avoids the philosophical problems with the Copenhagen interpretation and the role of the observer, and resolves various quantum paradoxes, such as quantum nonlocality, quantum entanglement and retrocausality.

=== Attempted resolution of causality ===
T. C. Scott and R. A. Moore demonstrated that the apparent acausality suggested by the presence of advanced Liénard–Wiechert potentials could be removed by recasting the theory in terms of retarded potentials only, without the complications of the absorber idea. The Lagrangian describing a particle ($p_1$) under the influence of the time-symmetric potential generated by another particle ($p_2$) is

$$L_1 = T_1 - \frac{1}{2} \left( (V_R)^2_1 + (V_A)^2_1 \right),$$

where $T_i$ is the relativistic kinetic energy functional of particle $p_i$, and $(V_R)^j_i$ and $(V_A)^j_i$ are respectively the retarded and advanced Liénard–Wiechert potentials acting on particle $p_i$ and generated by particle $p_j$. The corresponding Lagrangian for particle $p_2$ is

$$L_2 = T_2 - \frac{1}{2} \left( (V_R)^1_2 + (V_A)^1_2 \right).$$

It was originally demonstrated with computer algebra and then proven analytically that

$$(V_R)^i_j - (V_A)^j_i$$

is a total time derivative, i.e. a divergence in the calculus of variations, and thus it gives no contribution to the Euler–Lagrange equations. Thanks to this result the advanced potentials can be eliminated; here the total derivative plays the same role as the free field. The Lagrangian for the N-body system is therefore

$$L = \sum_{i=1}^N T_i  - \frac{1}{2} \sum_{i \ne j}^N (V_R)^i_j.$$

The resulting Lagrangian is symmetric under the exchange of $p_i$ with $p_j$. For $N = 2$ this Lagrangian will generate exactly the same equations of motion of $L_1$ and $L_2$. Therefore, from the point of view of an outside observer, everything is causal. This formulation reflects particle-particle symmetry with the variational principle applied to the N-particle system as a whole, and thus Tetrode's Machian principle. Only if we isolate the forces acting on a particular body do the advanced potentials make their appearance. This recasting of the problem comes at a price: the N-body Lagrangian depends on all the time derivatives of the curves traced by all particles, i.e. the Lagrangian is infinite-order. However, much progress was made in examining the unresolved issue of quantizing the theory. Also, this formulation recovers the Darwin Lagrangian, from which the Breit equation was originally derived, but without the dissipative terms. This ensures agreement with theory and experiment, up to but not including the Lamb shift. Numerical solutions for the classical problem were also found. Furthermore, Moore showed that a model by Feynman and Albert Hibbs is amenable to the methods of higher than first-order Lagrangians and revealed chaotic-like solutions. Moore and Scott showed that the radiation reaction can be alternatively derived using the notion that, on average, the net dipole moment is zero for a collection of charged particles, thereby avoiding the complications of the absorber theory.

This apparent acausality may be viewed as merely apparent, and this entire problem goes away. An opposing view was held by Einstein.

=== Alternative Lamb shift calculation ===
As mentioned previously, a serious criticism against the absorber theory is that its Machian assumption that point particles do not act on themselves does not allow (infinite) self-energies and consequently an explanation for the Lamb shift according to quantum electrodynamics (QED). Ed Jaynes proposed an alternate model where the Lamb-like shift is due instead to the interaction with other particles very much along the same notions of the Wheeler–Feynman absorber theory itself. One simple model is to calculate the motion of an oscillator coupled directly with many other oscillators. Jaynes has shown that it is easy to get both spontaneous emission and Lamb shift behavior in classical mechanics. Furthermore, Jaynes' alternative provides a solution to the process of "addition and subtraction of infinities" associated with renormalization.

This model leads to the same type of Bethe logarithm (an essential part of the Lamb shift calculation), vindicating Jaynes' claim that two different physical models can be mathematically isomorphic to each other and therefore yield the same results, a point also apparently made by Scott and Moore on the issue of causality.

== Relationship to quantum field theory ==
This universal absorber theory is mentioned in the chapter titled "Monster Minds" in Feynman's autobiographical work Surely You're Joking, Mr. Feynman! and in Vol. II of the Feynman Lectures on Physics. It led to the formulation of a framework of quantum mechanics using a Lagrangian and action as starting points, rather than a Hamiltonian, namely the formulation using Feynman path integrals, which proved useful in Feynman's earliest calculations in quantum electrodynamics and quantum field theory in general. Both retarded and advanced fields appear respectively as retarded and advanced propagators and also in the Feynman propagator and the Dyson propagator. In hindsight, the relationship between retarded and advanced potentials shown here is not so surprising as, in quantum field theory, the advanced propagator can be obtained from the retarded propagator by exchanging the roles of field source and test particle (usually within the kernel of a Green's function formalism). In quantum field theory, advanced and retarded fields are simply viewed as mathematical solutions of Maxwell's equations whose combinations are decided by the boundary conditions.

== See also ==
- Abraham–Lorentz force
- Causality
- Paradox of radiation of charged particles in a gravitational field
- Retrocausality
- Symmetry in physics and T-symmetry
- Transactional interpretation
- Two-state vector formalism

== Sources ==
- Wheeler, J. A.; Feynman, R. P. (April 1945). "Interaction with the Absorber as the Mechanism of Radiation" (PDF). Reviews of Modern Physics. 17 (2–3): 157–181. Bibcode:1945RvMP...17..157W. doi:10.1103/RevModPhys.17.157.
- Wheeler, J. A.; Feynman, R. P. (July 1949). "Classical Electrodynamics in Terms of Direct Interparticle Action". Reviews of Modern Physics. 21 (3): 425–433. Bibcode:1949RvMP...21..425W. doi:10.1103/RevModPhys.21.425.
