= Cyclotron radiation =

Radiation emitted by charged particles deflected by magnetic field

In particle physics, cyclotron radiation is electromagnetic radiation emitted by non-relativistic accelerating charged particles deflected by a magnetic field. The Lorentz force on the particles acts perpendicular to both the magnetic field lines and the particles' motion through them, creating an acceleration of charged particles that causes them to emit radiation as a result of the acceleration they undergo as they spiral around the lines of the magnetic field.

The name of this radiation derives from the cyclotron, a type of particle accelerator used since the 1930s to create highly energetic particles for study. The cyclotron makes use of the circular orbits that charged particles exhibit in a uniform magnetic field. Furthermore, the period of the orbit is independent of the energy of the particles, allowing the cyclotron to operate at a set frequency. Cyclotron radiation is emitted by all charged particles travelling through magnetic fields, not just those in cyclotrons. Cyclotron radiation from plasma in the interstellar medium or around black holes and other astronomical phenomena is an important source of information about distant magnetic fields.

== Properties ==
The power (energy per unit time) of the emission of each electron can be calculated:

$${-dE \over dt}={\sigma_t B^2 v^2 \over c \mu_0}$$

where E is energy, t is time, $\sigma_t$ is the Thomson cross section (total, not differential), B is the magnetic field strength, v is the velocity perpendicular to the magnetic field, c is the speed of light and $\mu_0$ is the permeability of free space.

Cyclotron radiation has a spectrum with its main spike at the same fundamental frequency as the particle's orbit, and harmonics at higher integral factors. Harmonics are the result of imperfections in the actual emission environment, which also create a broadening of the spectral lines. The most obvious source of line broadening is non-uniformities in the magnetic field; as an electron passes from one area of the field to another, its emission frequency will change with the strength of the field. Other sources of broadening include collisional broadening as the electron will invariably fail to follow a perfect orbit, distortions of the emission caused by interactions with the surrounding plasma, and relativistic effects if the charged particles are sufficiently energetic. When the electrons are moving at relativistic speeds, cyclotron radiation is known as synchrotron radiation.

The recoil experienced by a particle emitting cyclotron radiation is called radiation reaction. Radiation reaction acts as a resistance to motion in a cyclotron; and the work necessary to overcome it is the main energetic cost of accelerating a particle in a cyclotron. Cyclotrons are prime examples of systems which experience radiation reaction.

== Examples ==
In the context of magnetic fusion energy, cyclotron radiation losses translate into a requirement for a minimum plasma energy density in relation to the magnetic field energy density.

Cyclotron radiation would likely be produced in a high altitude nuclear explosion. Gamma rays produced by the explosion would ionize atoms in the upper atmosphere and those free electrons would interact with the Earth's magnetic field to produce cyclotron radiation in the form of an electromagnetic pulse (EMP). This phenomenon is of concern to the military as the EMP may damage solid state electronic equipment.

== See also ==
- Auroral kilometric radiation (AKR)
- Bremsstrahlung
- Beamstrahlung
- Synchrotron radiation
- Free electron laser
- Larmor formula
