= Betatron oscillations =

Basic concept in accelerator physics

Betatron oscillations are the fast transverse oscillations of a charged particle in various focusing systems, such as linear accelerators, storage rings or transfer channels. Oscillations are usually considered as a small deviations from the ideal reference orbit and determined by transverse forces of focusing elements, i.e., depending on transverse deviation value: quadrupole magnets, electrostatic lenses, RF-fields. This transverse motion is the subject of study of electron optics. Betatron oscillations were first studied by D.W. Kerst and R. Serber in 1941 while commissioning the first betatron. The fundamental study of betatron oscillations was carried out by Ernest Courant, M. Stanley Livingston and Hartland Snyder, who revolutionized high-energy accelerator design by applying the strong focusing principle.

== Hill's equations ==
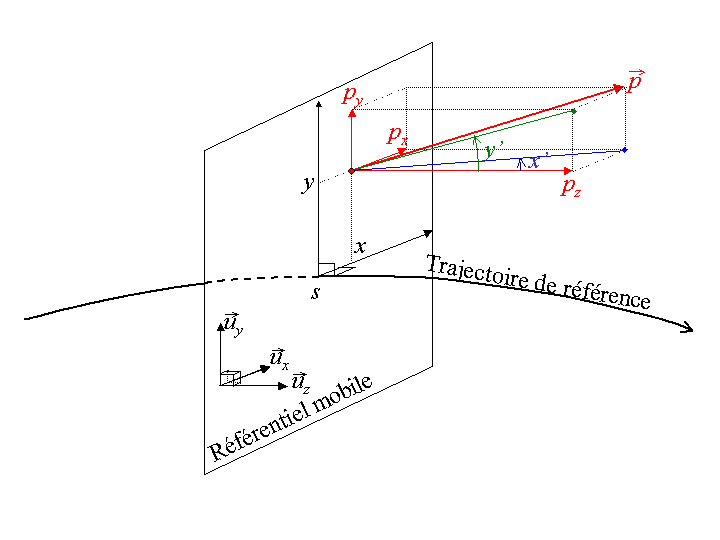
Moving coordinate system

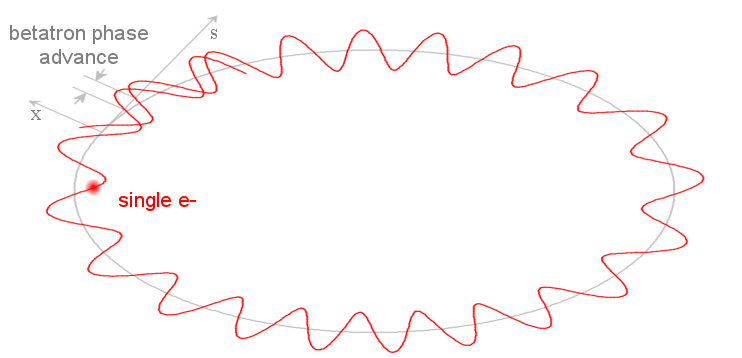
The betatron phase advance divided by $2\pi$ is called the tune (fractional part).

To hold particles of the beam inside the vacuum chamber of an accelerator or transfer channel, magnetic or electrostatic elements are used. The guiding field of dipole magnets sets the reference orbit of the beam while focusing magnets, whose field linearly depends on the transverse coordinates, applies small deviations to particles, forcing them to oscillate stably around a reference orbit. For any orbit one can locally use the Frenet–Serret coordinate system, which co-propagates with the reference particle. Assuming small deviations of the particle in all directions and after linearization of all the fields one will come to the linear equations of motion which are a pair of Hill equations:

$$\begin{cases}
x'' + k_x(s)x = 0 \\
y'' + k_y(s)y = 0 \\
\end{cases}.$$

Here $k_x(s) = \frac{1}{r_0^2} + \frac{G(s)}{B\rho}$, $k_y(s)=-\frac{G(s)}{B\rho}$ are periodic functions in a case of cyclic accelerator such as a betatron or synchrotron. $G(s)=\frac{\partial B_z}{\partial x}$ is a magnetic field gradient. Prime means derivative over s, path along the beam trajectory. The product of guiding field and curvature radius $B\rho = B\cdot r_0$ is the magnetic rigidity, which is related to the momentum via the Lorentz force $pc=eZB\rho$, where $eZ$ is a particle charge.

As the equations of transverse motion are independent from each other, they can be solved separately. For one-dimensional motion the solution of Hill equation is a quasi-periodical oscillation. It can be written as $x(s)= A\sqrt{\beta_x (s)} \cdot \cos(\Psi_x (s) + \phi_0)$, where $\beta(s)$ is the Twiss beta function, $\Psi (s)$ is a betatron phase advance and $A$ is an invariant amplitude known as Courant-Snyder invariant.

In lattices using high order magnets, such as sextupoles or octupoles, non-linear effects appear leading to tune shift with amplitude.

== Literature ==
- Edwards, D. A.; Syphers, M. J. (1993). An introduction to the physics of high energy accelerators. New York: Wiley. ISBN 978-0-471-55163--8.
- Wiedemann, Helmut (2007). Particle accelerator physics (3rd ed.). Berlin: Springer. pp. 158–161. ISBN 978-3-540-49043-2.
