= Alternating Gradient Synchrotron =

Particle accelerator at Brookhaven National Laboratory

Alternating Gradient Synchrotron (AGS)
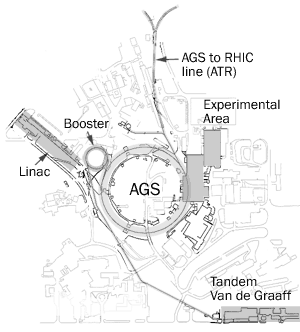
- A schematic view of the AGS complex at Brookhaven National Laboratory.

General properties
- Accelerator type: synchrotron
- Beam type: proton, heavy ion
- Target type: Injector for RHIC

Beam properties
- Maximum energy: 33 GeV
- Maximum current: 5×10^{13} protons per pulse

Physical properties
- Circumference: 2,650 feet (810 m)
- Location: Upton, New York
- Coordinates: 40.87430103°N 72.880168°W
- Institution: Brookhaven National Laboratory
- Dates of operation: 1960 - present

The Alternating Gradient Synchrotron (AGS) is a particle accelerator located at the Brookhaven National Laboratory in Long Island, New York, United States.

The Alternating Gradient Synchrotron was built on the innovative concept of the alternating gradient, or strong-focusing principle, developed by Brookhaven physicists. This new concept in accelerator design allowed scientists to accelerate protons to energies that were previously unachievable. The AGS became the world's premiere accelerator when it reached its design energy of 33 billion electron volts (GeV) on July 29, 1960.

Until 1968, the AGS was the highest energy accelerator in the world, slightly higher than its 28 GeV sister machine, the Proton Synchrotron at CERN, the European laboratory for high-energy physics. While 21st century accelerators can reach energies in the trillion electron volt region, the AGS earned researchers three Nobel Prizes and today serves as the injector for Brookhaven's Relativistic Heavy Ion Collider; it remains the world's highest intensity high-energy proton accelerator.

The AGS Booster, constructed in 1991, further augments the capabilities of the AGS, enabling it to accelerate more intense proton beams and heavy ions such as Gold. Brookhaven's linear particle accelerator (LINAC) provides 200 million electron volt (MeV) protons to the AGS Booster, and the Electron Beam Ion Source (EBIS) and Tandem Van de Graaff accelerators provide other ions to the AGS Booster. The AGS Booster then accelerates these particles for injection into the AGS. The AGS Booster also provides particle beams to the NASA Space Radiation Laboratory.

== Importance of alternate-gradient focusing ==
It became increasingly clear that if further progress was to be made in high energy nuclear physics by experiments using artificially accelerated particles some new principle must be found that would cheapen the cost per GeV. It was lucky for CERN that just at the time a European machine was being considered this new principle was discovered. The problem was simple enough. A cheaper machine could be built if the amplitudes of the free and forced oscillations of the accelerating particles could be decreased in some way so that the vacuum chamber size and the cross-section of the magnet ring could be reduced. The simplest way to reduce the amplitude of the free oscillations is to increase the frequency by increasing the restoring force, and although this is easy to achieve in the vertical direction by increasing the magnetic field gradient, the condition for horizontal stability is violated if n exceeds unity.

The new principle discovered by Christofilos and Courant, Livingston and Snyder increases the frequency of the betatron oscillations by alternating the sign of the gradient of the magnetic field. The structure of the magnet is no longer uniform round the ring with a constant gradient but is broken up into sectors whose gradient is alternatively positive and negative.

— J.B. Adams, "The Alternating Gradient Proton Synchrotron"

== Nobel Prizes ==
The work performed at the accelerator led to three Nobel Prizes in Physics:

- 1976: Samuel C. C. Ting discovered the J part of the J/ψ and the charm quark.
- 1980: James Cronin and Val Fitch discovered CP violation by experimenting with Kaons.
- 1988: Leon Lederman, Melvin Schwartz and Jack Steinberger discovered the muon neutrino.

== See also ==
- Strong focusing (also known as alternating-gradient focusing — an idea pioneered on this accelerator)
