= Courant–Snyder parameters =

Set of quantities in accelerator physics

One dimensional position-momentum plot, showing the beam ellipse described in terms of the Courant–Snyder parameters.

In accelerator physics, the Courant–Snyder parameters (frequently referred to as Twiss parameters or CS parameters) are a set of quantities used to describe the distribution of positions and velocities of the particles in a beam. When the positions along a single dimension and velocities (or momenta) along that dimension of every particle in a beam are plotted on a phase space diagram, an ellipse enclosing the particles can be given by the equation:

$$\gamma x^2 + 2 \alpha x x' + \beta x'^2 = \epsilon$$

where $x$ is the position axis and $x'$ is the velocity axis. In this formulation, $\alpha$, $\beta$, and $\gamma$ are the Courant–Snyder parameters for the beam along the given axis, and $\epsilon$ is the emittance. Three sets of parameters can be calculated for a beam, one for each orthogonal direction, x, y, and z.

For a single particle in the presence of only conservative forces, the trajectory of that particle in phase space will lie on the contour of an ellipse defined by the CS parameters at each point along the beamline. Such a particle will have an emittance $\epsilon$ which depends only on the amplitude of its motion (which is determined by its initial conditions).

== History ==
The use of these parameters to describe the phase space properties of particle beams was popularized in the accelerator physics community by Ernest Courant and Hartland Snyder in their 1953 paper, "Theory of the Alternating-Gradient Synchrotron". They are also widely referred to in accelerator physics literature as "Twiss parameters" after British astronomer Richard Q. Twiss, although it is unclear how his name became associated with the formulation.

== Phase space area description ==
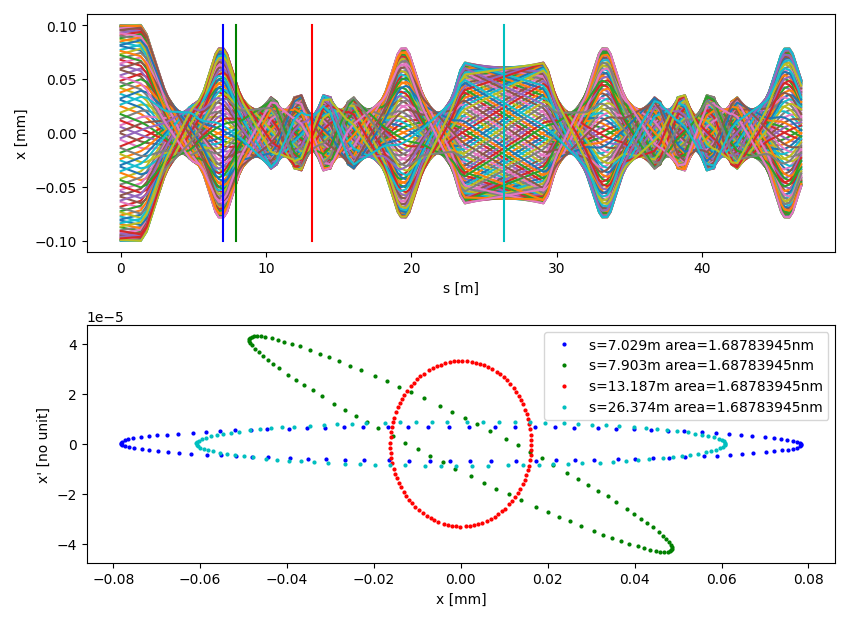
Trajectory of an on momentum single particle over 100 turns in the quasi linear zone of the EBS ring starting at the injection cell. Few ellipses are plotted in phase space. The area has been calculated with the (x,x') coordinates using the Shoelace formula. From these plots, we can, for instance, calculate $\beta$ at s=26.374m in the middle of the straight section, $\beta = \frac{{x_{max}}^2}{\epsilon} = \frac{\pi {x_{max}}^2}{area} = 6.9m$,$x_{max}=60.9\mu m$

When simulating the motion of particles through an accelerator or beam transport line, it is often desirable to describe the overall properties of an ensemble of particles, rather than track the motion of each particle individually. By Liouville's Theorem it can be shown that the density occupied on a position and momentum phase space plot is constant when the beam is only affected by conservative forces. The area occupied by the beam on this plot is known as the beam emittance, although there are a number of competing definitions for the exact mathematical definition of this property.

=== Coordinates ===
In accelerator physics, coordinate positions are usually defined with respect to an idealized reference particle, which follows the ideal design trajectory for the accelerator. The direction aligned with this trajectory is designated "z", (sometimes "s") and is also referred to as the longitudinal coordinate. Two transverse coordinate axes, x and y, are defined perpendicular to the z axis and to each other.

In addition to describing the positions of each particle relative to the reference particle along the x, y, and z axes, it is also necessary to consider the rate of change of each of these values. This is typically given as a rate of change with respect to the longitudinal coordinate (x' = dx/dz) rather than with respect to time. In most cases, x' and y' are both much less than 1, as particles will be moving along the beam path much faster than transverse to it. Given this assumption, it is possible to use the small angle approximation to express x' and y' as angles rather than simple ratios. As such, x' and y' are most commonly expressed in milliradians.

=== Ellipse equation ===
When an ellipse is drawn around the particle distribution in phase space, a general equation for that ellipse can be written as:

$$\gamma x^2 + 2 \alpha x x' + \beta x'^2 = \frac{area}{\pi}$$

Here, the area is an area in x, x' phase space, and has units of length * angle.

The exact usage of this area is a matter of convention. Some sources define the beam emittance $\epsilon$ to be the area itself, while others use $\frac{area}{\pi}$. While the difference between these two formulations of emittance is a factor of pi in the units, both formulations are used frequently enough that it is necessary to specify which one is in use.

For the case of

$area = \frac{\epsilon \pi}{\sqrt{\beta \gamma - \alpha^2}} = \epsilon \pi$, using $\beta \gamma - \alpha^2 = 1$

$$\gamma x^2 + 2 \alpha x x' + \beta x'^2 = \epsilon$$

In addition, it is also possible to define the area as a specific fraction of the particles in a beam with a 2 dimensional gaussian distribution.

The other three coefficients, $\alpha$, $\beta$, and $\gamma$, are the CS parameters. As this ellipse is an instantaneous plot of the positions and velocities of the particles at one point in the accelerator, these values will vary with time. Since there are only two independent variables per particle, x and x', and the emittance (however defined) is constant, only two of the CS parameters are independent. The relationship between the three parameters is given by:

$$\beta \gamma - \alpha^2 = 1$$

== Derivation for periodic systems ==
In addition to treating the CS parameters as an empirical description of a collection of particles in phase space, it is possible to derive them based on the equations of motion of particles in electromagnetic fields.

=== Equation of motion ===
In a strong focusing accelerator, transverse focusing is primarily provided by quadrupole magnets. The linear equation of motion for transverse motion parallel to an axis of the magnet is:

$$\frac{d^2 x}{dz^2} = -k(z) x$$

where $k(z)$ is the focusing coefficient, which has units of length^{−2}, and is only nonzero in a quadrupole field. (Note that x is used throughout this explanation, but y could be equivalently used with a change of sign for k. The longitudinal coordinate, z, requires a somewhat different derivation.)

Assuming $k(z)$ is periodic, for example, as in a circular accelerator, this is a differential equation with the same form as the Hill differential equation. The solution to this equation is a pseudo harmonic oscillator called betatron oscillations:

$$x(z) = A(z) \cos(\phi(z) + \phi_o)$$

where A(z) is the amplitude of oscillation, $\phi(z)$ is the "betatron phase" which is dependent on the value of $k(z)$, and $\phi_o$ is the initial phase. The amplitude is decomposed into a position dependent part $\beta$ and an initial value $A_o$, such that:

$$x(z) = A_o \sqrt{\beta} \cos(\phi(z) + \phi_o)$$
$$x'(z) = A_o \frac{\beta'}{2\sqrt{\beta}} \cos(\phi(z) + \phi_o) - A_o \frac{1}{\sqrt{\beta}} \sin(\phi(z) + \phi_o)$$

(It is important to remember that ' continues to indicated a derivative with respect to position along the direction of travel, not time.)

=== Particle distributions ===
Given these equations of motion, taking the average values for particles in a beam yields:

$$\langle x^2\rangle =A_o^2 \beta \langle \cos^2(\phi(z)+\phi_o)\rangle = \frac{1}{2}A_o^2\beta$$
$$\langle {x'}^2 \rangle = A_o^2 \frac{(-\beta'/2)^2}{2\beta} + A_o^2 \frac{1}{2\beta} = (1 + (-\beta'/2)^2) \frac{A_o^2}{2\beta}$$
$$\langle x x' \rangle = -\frac{A_o^2}{2} (-\beta'/2)$$

These can be simplified with the following definitions:

$$\epsilon = \frac{1}{2}A_o^2$$
$$\alpha = -\frac{\beta'}{2}$$
$$\gamma = \frac{1+\alpha^2}{\beta}$$

giving:

$$\langle x^2\rangle = \epsilon \beta$$
$$\langle {x'}^2 \rangle = \epsilon \gamma$$
$$\langle x x' \rangle = -\epsilon \alpha$$

These are the CS parameters and emittance in another form. Combined with the relationship between the parameters, this also leads to a definition of emittance for an arbitrary (not necessarily Gaussian) particle distribution:

$$\epsilon^2 = \langle x^2 \rangle \langle x'^2 \rangle - \langle x x' \rangle^2$$

== Properties ==
The advantage of describing a particle distribution parametrically using the CS parameters is that the evolution of the overall distribution can be calculated using matrix optics more easily than tracking each individual particle and then combining the locations at multiple points along the accelerator path. For example, if a particle distribution with parameters $\alpha$, $\beta$, and $\gamma$ passes through an empty space of length $L$, the values $\alpha(L)$, $\beta(L)$, and $\gamma(L)$ at the end of that space are given by:

$$\begin{pmatrix}
\beta(L) \\
\alpha(L) \\
\gamma(L)
\end{pmatrix} =
\begin{pmatrix}
1 & -2L & L^2 \\
0 & 1 & -L  \\
0 & 0 & 1
\end{pmatrix}
\begin{pmatrix}
\beta\\ \alpha \\ \gamma
\end{pmatrix}$$

== See also ==
- Beam emittance
- Beta function (accelerator physics)
- Ray transfer matrix analysis
