= Val Logsdon Fitch =

American nuclear physicist (1923–2015)

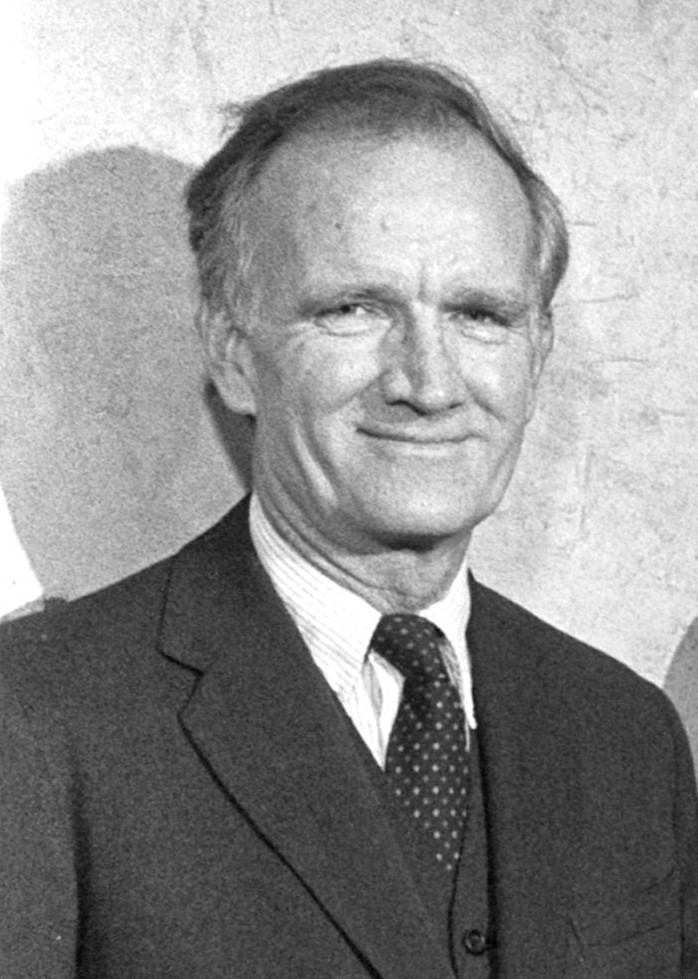
- Born: March 10, 1923; Merriman, Nebraska
- Died: February 5, 2015 (aged 91); Princeton, New Jersey
- Education: Chadron State College; Northwestern University; Carnegie Mellon University; McGill University (BS); Columbia University (MS, PhD)
- Known for: Discovery of CP-violation
- Awards: E. O. Lawrence Award (1968); John Price Wetherill Medal (1976); Nobel Prize in Physics (1980); National Medal of Science (1993)
- Scientific career
- Fields: Particle physics
- Workplaces: Manhattan Project; Princeton University
- Thesis: Studies of X-rays from Mu-Mesonic Atoms (1954)
- Doctoral advisor: James Rainwater

Val Logsdon Fitch (March 10, 1923 – February 5, 2015) was an American nuclear physicist who, with co-researcher James Cronin, was awarded the 1980 Nobel Prize in Physics for a 1964 experiment using the Alternating Gradient Synchrotron at Brookhaven National Laboratory that proved that certain subatomic reactions do not adhere to fundamental symmetry principles. Specifically, they proved, by examining the decay of K-mesons, that a reaction run in reverse does not retrace the path of the original reaction, which showed that the reactions of subatomic particles are not indifferent to time. Thus the phenomenon of CP violation was discovered. This demolished the faith that physicists had that natural laws were governed by symmetry.

Born on a cattle ranch near Merriman, Nebraska, Fitch was drafted into the U.S. Army during World War II, and worked on the Manhattan Project at the Los Alamos Laboratory in New Mexico. He later graduated from McGill University, and completed his PhD in physics in 1954 at Columbia University. He was a member of the faculty at Princeton University from 1954 until his retirement in 2005.

== Early life ==
Val Logsdon Fitch was born on a cattle ranch near Merriman, Nebraska, on March 10, 1923, the youngest of three children of Fred Fitch, a cattle rancher, and his wife Frances née Logsdon, a school teacher. He had an older brother and sister. The family farm was about 4 square miles (10 km^{2}) in size. The ranch was small; his father specialized in raising breeding stock. Soon after his birth, his father was badly injured in a horse riding accident and could no longer work on his ranch, so the family moved to the nearby town of Gordon, Nebraska, where his father entered the insurance business. Here he attended school, graduating from Gordon High School in 1940 as valedictorian.

== Manhattan Project ==
Fitch attended Chadron State College for three years, then transferred to Northwestern University. This was during WWII; his studies were interrupted by being drafted into the US Army in 1943. After completing basic training, he was sent to Carnegie Institute of Technology for training under the Army Specialized Training Program. Under this program, some 200,000 soldiers attended colleges for intensive courses. Fitch was in the program for less than a year before the manpower requirements of the war became too great, and the Army terminated the program. Most of the soldiers in the ASTP were posted to combat units, but Fitch was one of a hundred or so ASTP soldiers who joined the Special Engineer Detachment (SED), which provided much-needed technicians to the Manhattan Project.

The Army sent Fitch to the Manhattan Project's Los Alamos Laboratory in New Mexico. By mid-1944, about a third of the technicians at Los Alamos were from the SED. There he met many of the greats of physics including Niels Bohr, James Chadwick, Enrico Fermi, Isidor Isaac Rabi, Bruno Rossi, Emilio Segrè, Edward Teller and Richard C. Tolman, in some cases attending physics courses taught by them. He worked in the group headed by Ernest Titterton, a member of the British Mission, and became well-acquainted with the techniques of experimental physics. He participated in the drop testing of mock atomic bombs that was conducted at Wendover Army Air Field and the Naval Auxiliary Air Station Salton Sea, and worked at the Trinity site, where he witnessed the Trinity nuclear test on July 16, 1945. He was discharged from the Army in 1946. He continued to work at Los Alamos as a civilian for another year to earn money. He briefly returned to Los Alamos in summer 1948.

== Academic career ==
His wartime experiences led Fitch to decide to become a physicist. Robert Bacher, the head of the physics division at Los Alamos, offered him a graduate assistantship at Cornell University, but first he needed to complete his undergraduate degree. Rather than return to Northwestern or Carnegie Mellon, he elected to enter McGill University, which Titterton had recommended. Fitch graduated from McGill with a bachelor's degree in electrical engineering in 1948. On the advice of Jerry Kellogg, who had been a student of Rabi's at Columbia University, and was a division head at the Los Alamos, Fitch decided to pursue his doctoral studies at Columbia. Kellogg wrote him a letter of introduction to Rabi. James Rainwater became his academic supervisor. Rainwater gave him a paper by John Wheeler concerning mu-mesic atoms, atoms in which an electron is replaced by a muon. These had never been observed; they were completely theoretical and there was no evidence that they existed, but it made a good thesis topic.

Fitch designed and built an experiment to measure the gamma rays emitted from mu-mesic atoms. As it turned out, this was a good time to search for them. Columbia had recently commissioned a cyclotron at the Nevis Laboratories that could produce muons; Robert Hofstadter had developed the thallium-activated sodium iodide gamma ray detector; and wartime advances in electronics yielded advances in components such as new phototubes needed to bring it all together. Initially nothing was found, but Rainwater suggested expanding the search beyond the energy range predicted by Wheeler on the basis of the then-accepted size of the radius of the atomic nucleus as around 1.4 × 10^{−15} m. When this was done, they found what they had been looking for, discovering in the process that the nucleus was closer to 1.2 × 10^{−15} m. He completed his PhD in 1954, writing his thesis on "Studies of X-rays from mu-mesonic atoms". The thesis was published in the Physical Review in November 1953.

In 1949, Fitch married Elise Cunningham, a secretary who worked in the laboratory at Columbia. They had two sons. Elise died in 1972, and in 1976 he married Daisy Harper Sharp, thereby acquiring two stepdaughters and a stepson. After obtaining his doctorate, Fitch's interest shifted to strange particles and K mesons. In 1954, he joined the physics faculty at Princeton University, where he spent the rest of his career. He was the Class of 1909 Professor of Physics from 1969 to 1976, the Cyrus Fogg Brackett Professor of Physics from 1976 to 1982, and the James S. McDonnell Distinguished University Professor of Physics from 1982 to 1993, when he retired and took up the position of visiting lecturer with the rank of professor for three years before entering emeritus status. He was chair of the physics department from 1976 to 1981.

Fitch conducted much of his research at the Brookhaven National Laboratory, where he became acquainted with James Cronin. The two of them played bridge at nights while they waited for the Cosmotron to become available. Cronin had built a new kind of detector, a spark chamber spectrometer, and Fitch realized that it would be perfect for experiments with K mesons (now known as kaons), which Yale University physicist Robert Adair had suggested had interesting properties worth investigating. They could decay into either matter or antimatter. Along with two colleagues, James Christenson and René Turlay, they set up their experiment on the Alternating Gradient Synchrotron at Brookhaven. They discovered an unexpected result. The decay of neutral K mesons did not respect CP symmetry. K mesons that decayed into positrons did so faster than those that decayed into electrons. The importance of this result was not immediately appreciated; but as evidence of the Big Bang accumulated, Andrei Sakharov realized in 1967 that it explained why the universe is largely made of matter and not antimatter. Put simply, they had found "the answer to the physicist's 'Why do we exist?'" For this discovery, Fitch and Cronin received the 1980 Nobel Prize in Physics.

In addition to the Nobel Prize, Fitch received the Ernest Orlando Lawrence Award in 1968, the John Price Wetherill Medal in 1976 and the National Medal of Science in 1993. He was a member of the Board of Sponsors of the Bulletin of the Atomic Scientists and the JASON defense advisory group. He was elected a Fellow of the American Physical Society in 1964 and a Member of both the National Academy of Sciences and the American Academy of Arts and Sciences in 1966. In 1981, Fitch became a founding member of the World Cultural Council and received the Golden Plate Award of the American Academy of Achievement. He was president of the American Physical Society from 1988 to 1989, and he served on a number of governmental science and science policy committees, including the President's Science Advisory Committee from 1970 to 1973.

Fitch is one of the 20 American recipients of the Nobel Prize in Physics to sign a letter addressed to President George W. Bush in May 2008, urging him to "reverse the damage done to basic science research in the Fiscal Year 2008 Omnibus Appropriations Bill" by requesting additional emergency funding for the Department of Energy’s Office of Science, the National Science Foundation, and the National Institute of Standards and Technology.

He died at his home in Princeton, New Jersey, at the age of 91 on February 5, 2015.

== Publications ==
- Fitch, V. "Some Notes on Wideband Feedback Amplifiers", Los Alamos National Laboratory, United States Department of Energy (through predecessor agency the Atomic Energy Commission), (March 16, 1949).
- Fitch, V. "A High Resolution Scale-of-four", Columbia University, United States Department of Energy (through predecessor agency the Atomic Energy Commission), (August 25, 1949).
