= Beta function (accelerator physics) =

The beta function in accelerator physics is a function related to the transverse size of the particle beam at the location s along the nominal beam trajectory.

It is related to the transverse beam size as follows:

$\sigma(s) = \sqrt{\epsilon \cdot \beta(s)}$

where

- $s$ is the location along the nominal beam trajectory
- the beam is assumed to have a Gaussian shape in the transverse direction
- $\sigma(s)$ is the width parameter of this Gaussian
- $\epsilon$ is the RMS geometrical beam emittance, which is normally constant along the trajectory when there is no acceleration

Typically, separate beta functions are used for two perpendicular directions in the plane transverse to the beam direction (e.g. horizontal and vertical directions).

The beta function is one of the Courant–Snyder parameters (also called Twiss parameters).

== Beta star ==
The value of the beta function at an interaction point is referred to as beta star. The beta function is typically adjusted to have a local minimum at such points (in order to minimize the beam size and thus maximise the interaction rate). Assuming that this point is in a drift space, one can show that the evolution of the beta function around the minimum point is given by:

$$\beta(z) = \beta^* + \dfrac{z^2}{\beta^*}$$

where z is the distance along the nominal beam direction from the minimum point.

This implies that the smaller the beam size at the interaction point, the faster the rise of the beta function (and thus the beam size) when going away from the interaction point. In practice, the aperture of the beam line elements (e.g. focusing magnets) around the interaction point limit how small beta star can be made.
