= Oppenheimer–Snyder model =

Exact solution to the Einstein field equations

In general relativity, the Oppenheimer–Snyder model is a solution to the Einstein field equations based on the Schwarzschild metric describing the collapse of an object of extreme mass into a black hole. It is named after physicists J. Robert Oppenheimer and Hartland Snyder, who published it in 1939.

During the collapse of a star to a black hole the geometry on the outside of the sphere is the Schwarzschild geometry. However the geometry inside is the same Robertson-Walker geometry as in the rest of the observable universe.

== History ==
Albert Einstein, who had developed his theory of general relativity in 1915, initially denied the possibility of black holes, even though they were a genuine implication of the Schwarzschild metric, obtained by Karl Schwarzschild in 1916, the first known non-trivial exact solution to Einstein's field equations. In 1939, Einstein published "On a Stationary System with Spherical Symmetry Consisting of Many Gravitating Masses" in the Annals of Mathematics, claiming to provide "a clear understanding as to why these 'Schwarzschild singularities' do not exist in physical reality."

Months after the issuing of Einstein's article, J. Robert Oppenheimer and his student Hartland Snyder studied this topic with their paper "On Continued Gravitational Contraction" making the opposite argument as Einstein's. They showed when a sufficiently massive star runs out of thermonuclear fuel, it will undergo continued gravitational contraction and become separated from the rest of the universe by a boundary called the event horizon, which not even light can escape. This paper predicted the existence of what are today known as black holes. The term "black hole" was coined decades later, in the fall of 1967, by John Archibald Wheeler at a conference held by the Goddard Institute for Space Studies in New York City; it appeared for the first time in print the following year. In this paper, Oppenheimer and Snyder used Einstein's own theory of gravity to prove how black holes could develop for the first time in contemporary physics, but without referencing the aforementioned article by Einstein. Oppenheimer and Snyder did, however, refer to an earlier article by Oppenheimer and Robert Serber on neutron stars, improving upon the work of Lev Davidovich Landau, in what was essentially an exercise in nuclear physics and gravitation.

This investigation attracted the attention of Richard Chace Tolman, who had previously obtained an exact solution to the Einstein field equations describing a static ideal fluid sphere. Oppenheimer and George Volkoff subsequently published paper on the stability of neutron stars, the Tolman-Oppenheimer-Volkoff limit. These papers established the foundation for the general-relativistic theory of stellar structure. Actually, the objects Tolman, Oppenheimer, and Volkoff studied were the neutron stars of Fritz Zwicky rather than the "neutron cores" of Lev Landau. But while Zwicky did introduce the notion of neutron stars, much of his work on this topic was later rejected as wrong. By contrast, the paper by Oppenheimer and Volkoff has been accepted as correct. This led Oppenheimer to consider the natural next problem of determining what would happen if a neutron star were so heavy it would collapse due to its own weight.

However, Oppenheimer would not revisit the topic in future publications.

== Model ==
The Oppenheimer–Snyder model of continued gravitational collapse is described by the line element
$$ds^2 = -d\tau^2 + A^2(\eta) \left(\frac{dR^2}{1 - 2M \frac{R^2_-}{R^2_b} \frac{1}{R_+}} + R^2 \, d\Omega^2 \right)$$
The quantities appearing in this expression are as follows:

- The coordinates are $(\tau, R, \theta, \phi)$ where $\theta, \phi$ are spherical coordinates.
- $R_b > 0$ is the boundary of the matter region
- $M > 0$ the mass.
- $R_- = \mathrm{min}(R, R_b)$ and $R_+ = \mathrm{max}(R, R_b)$.
- $\eta$ is defined implicitly by the equation

$$\tau(\eta, R) = \frac{1}{2}\sqrt \frac{R_+^3}{2M} (\eta + \sin \eta).$$

- $A(\eta) = \frac{1 + \cos \eta}{2}$.

This expression is valid both in the matter region $R < R_b$, and the vacuum region $R > R_b$, and continuously transitions between the two.

== Reception and legacy ==
Kip Thorne recalled that physicists were initially skeptical of the model, viewing it as "truly strange" at the time. He explained further, "It was hard for people of that era to understand the paper because the things that were being smoked out of the mathematics were so different from any mental picture of how things should behave in the universe." Werner Israel noted that the work of Oppenheimer and his collaborators on the end states of compact objects had actually been foreshadowed by the discovery of an upper limit on the mass of a white dwarf by Subrahmanyan Chandrasekhar. Yet, like the works of Oppenheimer and his colleagues, this was initially rejected and almost forgotten. While physicists had become used to the relativity of the passage of time in different frames of reference, the gravitational time dilation implied by the Oppenheimer-Snyder model was too extreme for most physicists at the time to accept. For a distant inertial observer, the surface of the star undergoing continued gravitational implosion would freeze at the critical radius (the Schwarzschild radius) but for an observer on the surface of the star, the process would continue. Moreover, any light emitted at the critical radius would be infinitely red shifted, making the star appear to "cut itself off" from the external universe.

Oppenheimer himself thought little of this discovery. However, some considered the model's discovery to be more significant than Oppenheimer did, and the model would later be described as forward thinking. Freeman Dyson thought it was Oppenheimer's greatest contribution to science. Lev Davidovich Landau added the Oppenheimer-Snyder paper to his "golden list" of classic papers. Due to Landau's influence, most Soviet theoretical physicists accepted this result as well. John Archibald Wheeler was initially an opponent of the model until the late 1950s, when he was asked to teach a course on general relativity at Princeton University. Wheeler claimed at a conference in 1958 that the Oppenheimer-Snyder model had neglected the many features of a realistic star. Indeed, in order to keep the mathematics manageable, Oppenheimer and Snyder assumed a perfectly spherical star with no spin, zero internal pressure, uniform density, no mass ejection, no shock waves, and no radiation emission. However, he later changed his mind completely after being informed by Edward Teller of the results of a computer simulation ran by Stirling Colgate and his team at the Lawrence Livermore National Laboratory. Colgate and his colleagues adapted the computer codes for developing the thermonuclear bomb (the Teller-Ulam design) to simulate the gravitational implosion of a star. They assumed that the star was spherical and not rotating, but otherwise took into account all the complications of a real star. They found that a sufficiently heavy star would undergo continued gravitational contraction in a manner similar to the idealized scenario described by Oppenheimer and Snyder. Independently, a team led by Yakov Borisovich Zeldovich relied on their own expertise and computer simulations for the Soviet Union's hydrogen bomb (the Sakharov-Zeldovich idea) and reached the same conclusion.

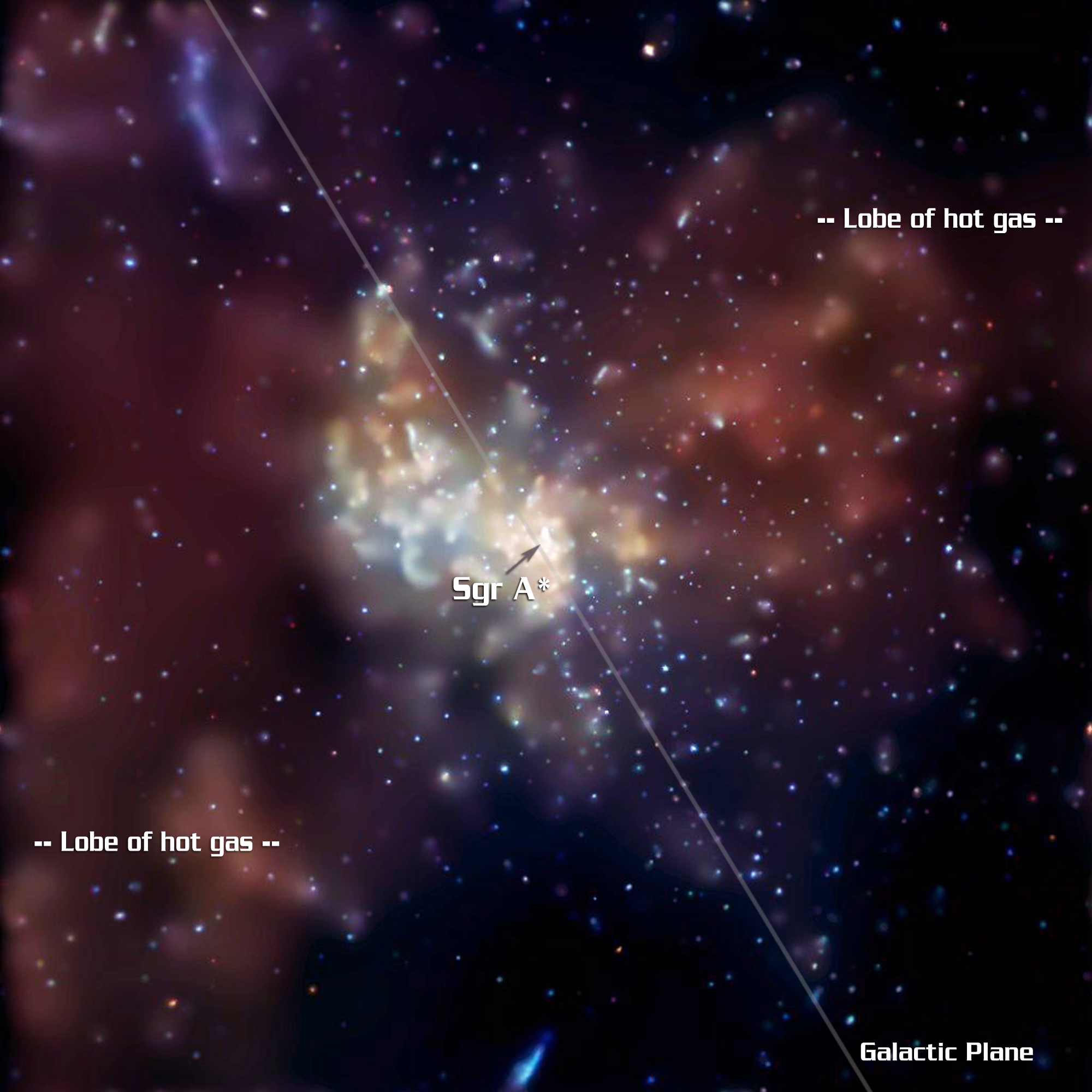
Labeled image of Sagittarius A* taken by the Chandra X-ray Observatory in 2003

At the First Texas Symposium on Relativistic Astrophysics in 1963, Wheeler gave a lengthy lecture on gravitational contraction, in which he shared his enthusiasm for the Oppenheimer-Snyder model. He subsequently played a key role in reviving interest in general relativity in the United States, and popularized the term "black hole" in the late 1960s. Various theoretical physicists pursued this topic and by the late 1960s and early 1970s, advances in observational astronomy, such as radio telescopes, changed the attitude of the scientific community. Pulsars and quasars had already been discovered and neither neutron stars nor black holes were considered mere textbook curiosities. Cygnus X-1, the first solid black-hole candidate, was discovered by the Uhuru X-ray space telescope in 1971. Observations of the central radio source of the Milky Way, Sagittarius A*, and the center of the spiral galaxy NGC 4258, both of which identified as supermassive black holes, came in the 1990s. Further evidence arrived in the 2000s thanks to the Hubble Space Telescope and the Chandra X-ray Observatory. The works of Oppenheimer and his collaborates was the initial impetus for this golden age of astrophysics. Jeremy Bernstein described the Oppenheimer-Snyder publication as "one of the great papers in twentieth-century physics."

A mental block for many physicists who were skeptical of the Oppenheimer-Snyder model was the so-called "Schwarzschild singularity"—meaning the boundary of a black hole—which turned out to be a removable by a change of coordinates. (The central singularity, however, cannot be removed.) In 1958, David Finkelstein found such a coordinate transformation and gave a lecture on it at King's College London. Roger Penrose was in attendance. (Arthur Stanley Eddington had introduced the same idea earlier, but the true significance of this insight was not understood and it was soon forgotten.) Penrose won the Nobel Prize in Physics in 2020 for his contributions to the mathematical theory of black holes, one of the frontiers of modern theoretical physics. He credited the Oppenheimer–Snyder model as one of his inspirations for research.

The Hindu wrote in 2023:

The world of physics does indeed remember the paper. While Oppenheimer is remembered in history as the “father of the atomic bomb”, his greatest contribution as a physicist was on the physics of black holes. The work of Oppenheimer and Hartland Snyder helped transform black holes from figments of mathematics to real, physical possibilities – something to be found in the cosmos out there.

== In popular culture ==
- In the 2023 film Oppenheimer, an interaction between Oppenheimer and his student Snyder occurs as their paper was published on the same day as the invasion of Poland.

== See also ==
- Tolman–Oppenheimer–Volkoff equation
- Timeline of gravitational physics and relativity
