= Dynamic aperture (accelerator physics) =

The dynamic aperture is the stability region of phase space in a circular accelerator.

== For hadrons ==
In the case of protons or heavy ion accelerators, (or synchrotrons, or storage rings), there is minimal radiation, and hence the dynamics is symplectic. For long term stability, tiny dynamical diffusion (or Arnold diffusion) can lead an initially stable orbit slowly into an unstable region. This makes the dynamic aperture problem particularly challenging. One may be considering stability over billions of turns. A scaling law for Dynamic aperture vs. number of turns has been proposed by Giovannozzi.

== For electrons ==
For the case of electrons, the electrons will radiate which causes a damping effect. This means that one typically only cares about stability over thousands of turns.

== Methods to compute or optimize dynamic aperture ==
The basic method for computing dynamic aperture involves the use of a tracking code. A model of the ring is built within the code that includes an integration routine for each magnetic element. The particle is tracked many turns and stability is determined.

In addition, there are other quantities that may be computed to characterize the dynamics, and can be related to the dynamic aperture. One example is the tune shift with amplitude.

There have also been other proposals for approaches to enlarge dynamic aperture, such as:
