= Cosmotron =

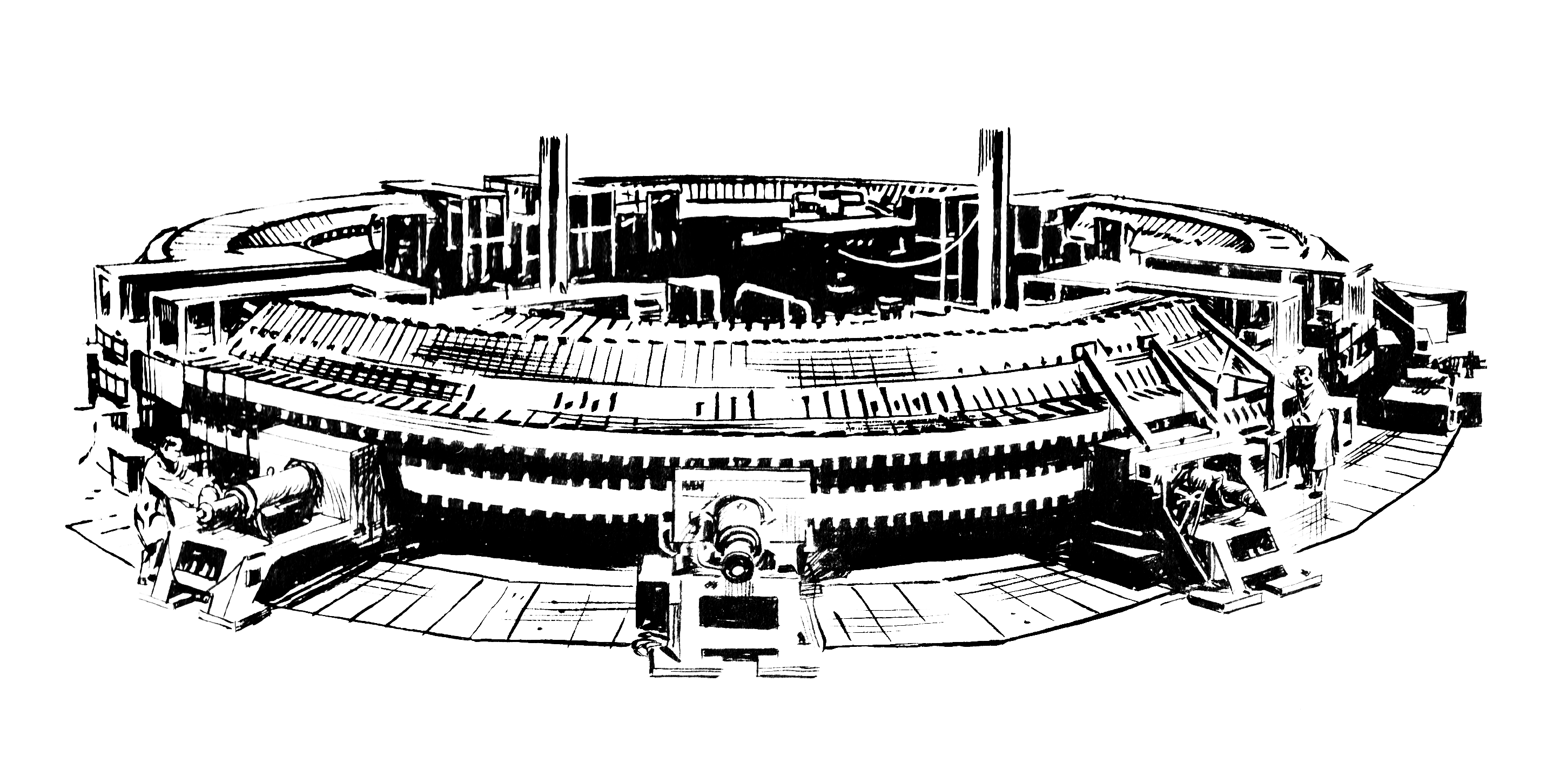
- A drawing of the Cosmotron

General properties
- Accelerator type: Synchrotron
- Beam type: protons
- Target type: Fixed target

Beam properties
- Maximum energy: 3.3 GeV

Physical properties
- Circumference: 236 feet (72 m)
- Location: Upton, New York
- Coordinates: 40.8725°N 72.88303°W
- Institution: Brookhaven National Laboratory
- Dates of operation: 1953 - 1966

The Cosmotron was a particle accelerator, specifically a proton synchrotron, at Brookhaven National Laboratory. Its construction was approved by the U.S. Atomic Energy Commission in 1948, reaching its full energy in 1953, and continuing to run until 1966. It was dismantled in 1969.

It was the first particle accelerator to impart kinetic energy in the range of GeV to a single particle, accelerating protons to 3.3 GeV. It was also the first accelerator to allow the extraction of the particle beam for experiments located physically outside the accelerator. It was used to observe a number of mesons previously seen only in cosmic rays, and to make the first discoveries of heavy, unstable particles (called V particles at the time) leading to the experimental confirmation of the theory of associated production of strange particles. It was the first accelerator that was able to produce all positive and negative mesons known to exist in cosmic rays. Its discoveries include the first vector meson.

The name chosen for the synchrotron was Cosmitron (representing an ambition to produce cosmic rays) but was changed to Cosmotron to sound like the cyclotron. The beam size of 64 × 15 cm and an energy goal of about 3 GeV determined the machine parameters. The synchrotron had a 75-foot/22.9-meter diameter. It consisted of 288 magnets each weighing 6 tons and providing up to 1.5 T, forming four curved sections. The range of field change was kept within limits by first accelerating particles to an intermediate energy in another accelerator and then injected into the Cosmotron. The straight sections without magnets were worrisome because there was no focusing and the betatron oscillations would change suddenly and might swing wildly. But, all these major problems were overcome.

== Gallery ==
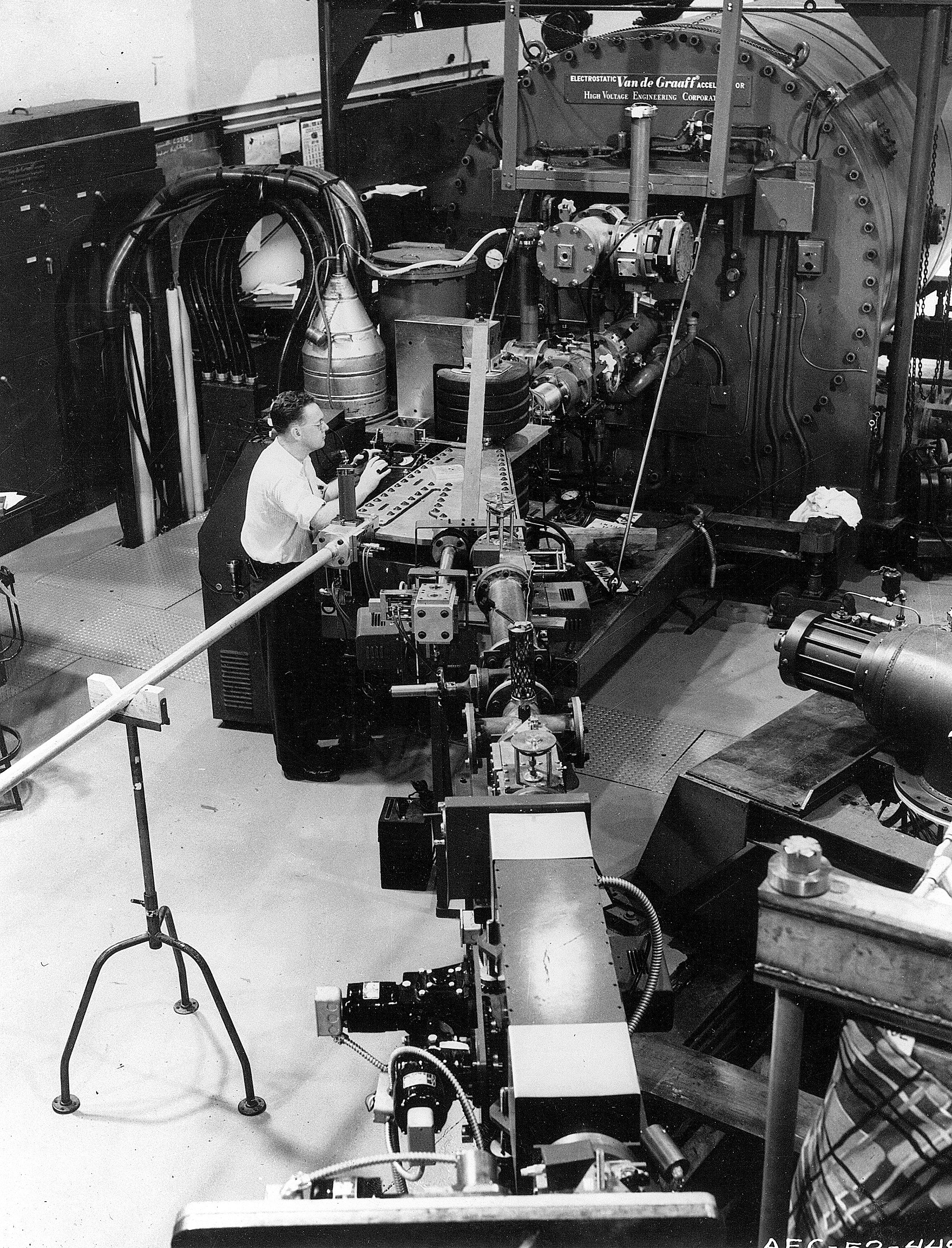
HD.6B.430 - Injection system for the Cosmotron at the Brookhaven National Laboratory. c. 1952

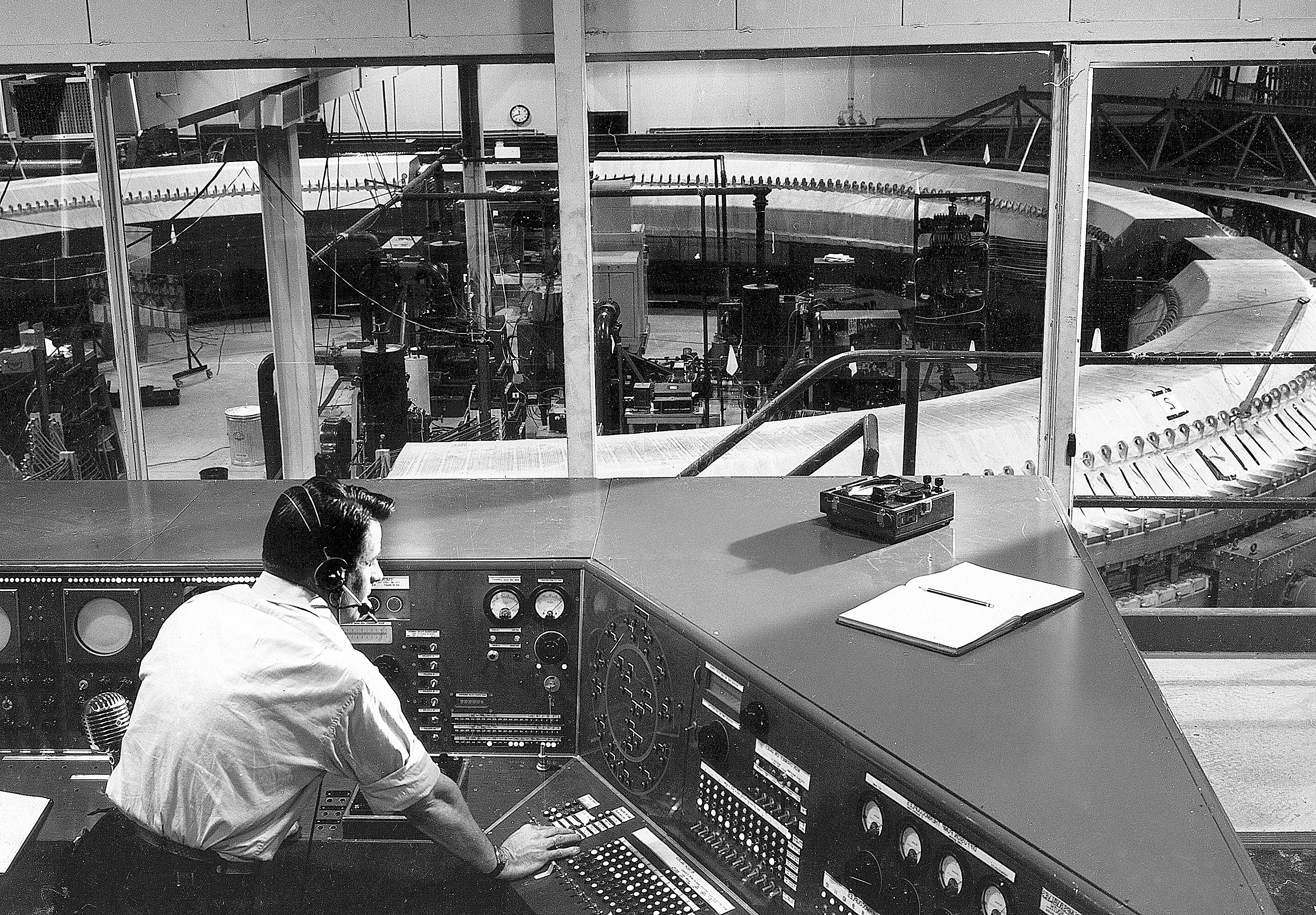
HD.6B.438 - General view of the Cosmotron from the main control console. Equipment in the center of the ring is mainly vacuum gear. (Personnel - E. Maher). c. 1952

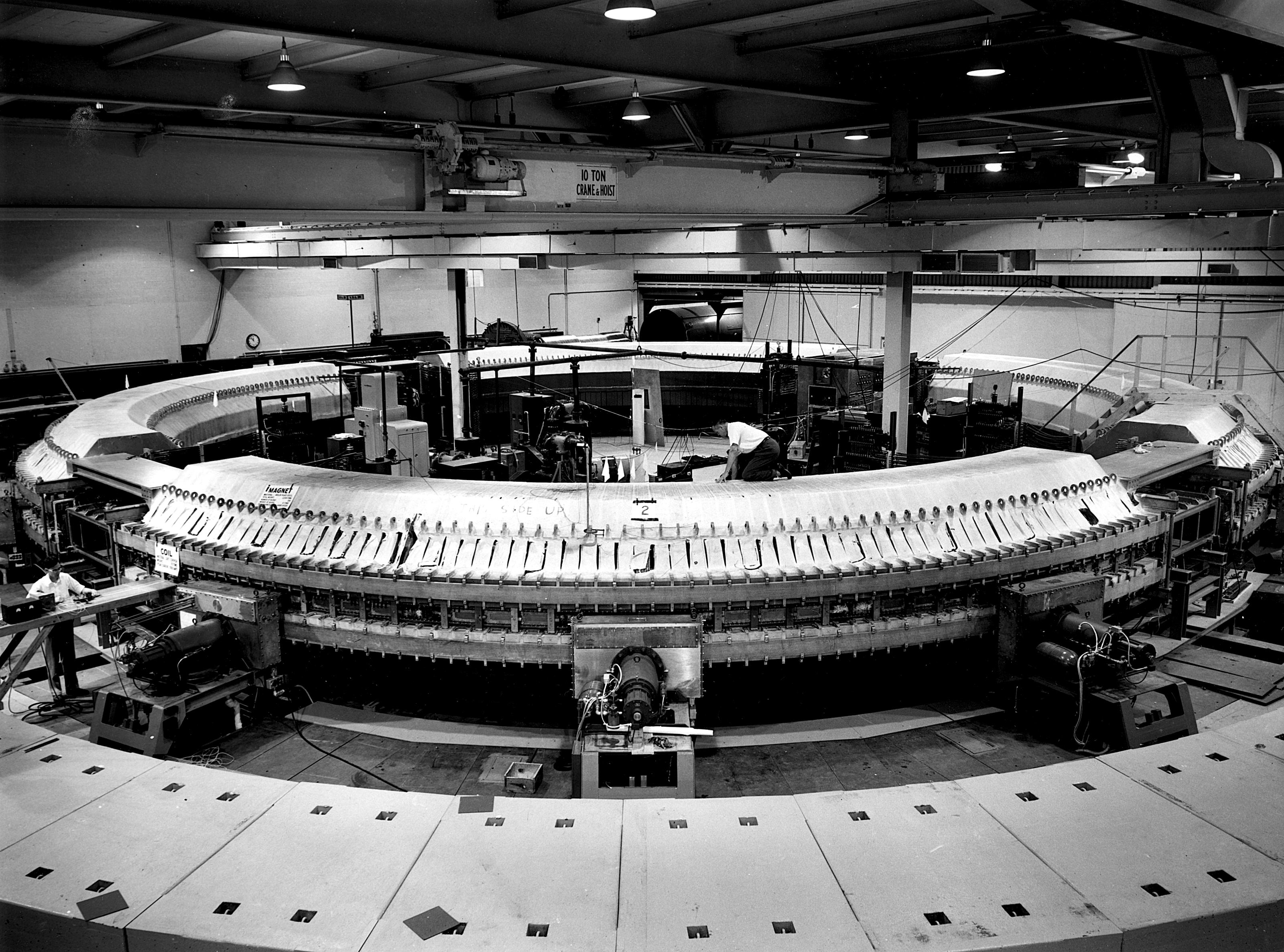
HD.6B.448 - No description provided.

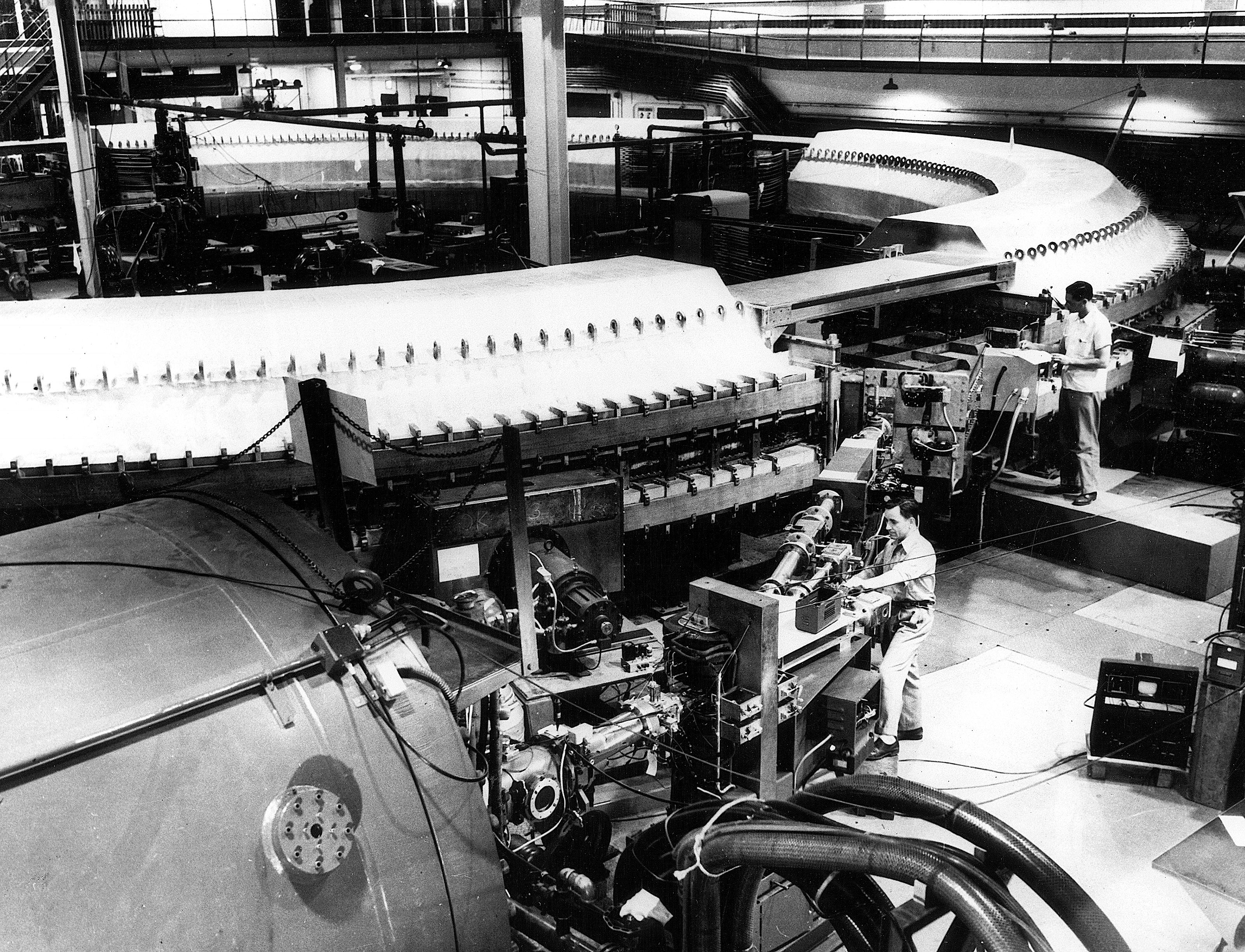
HD.6B.427 - Injection equipment connected to Brookhaven cosmotron. c. 1958

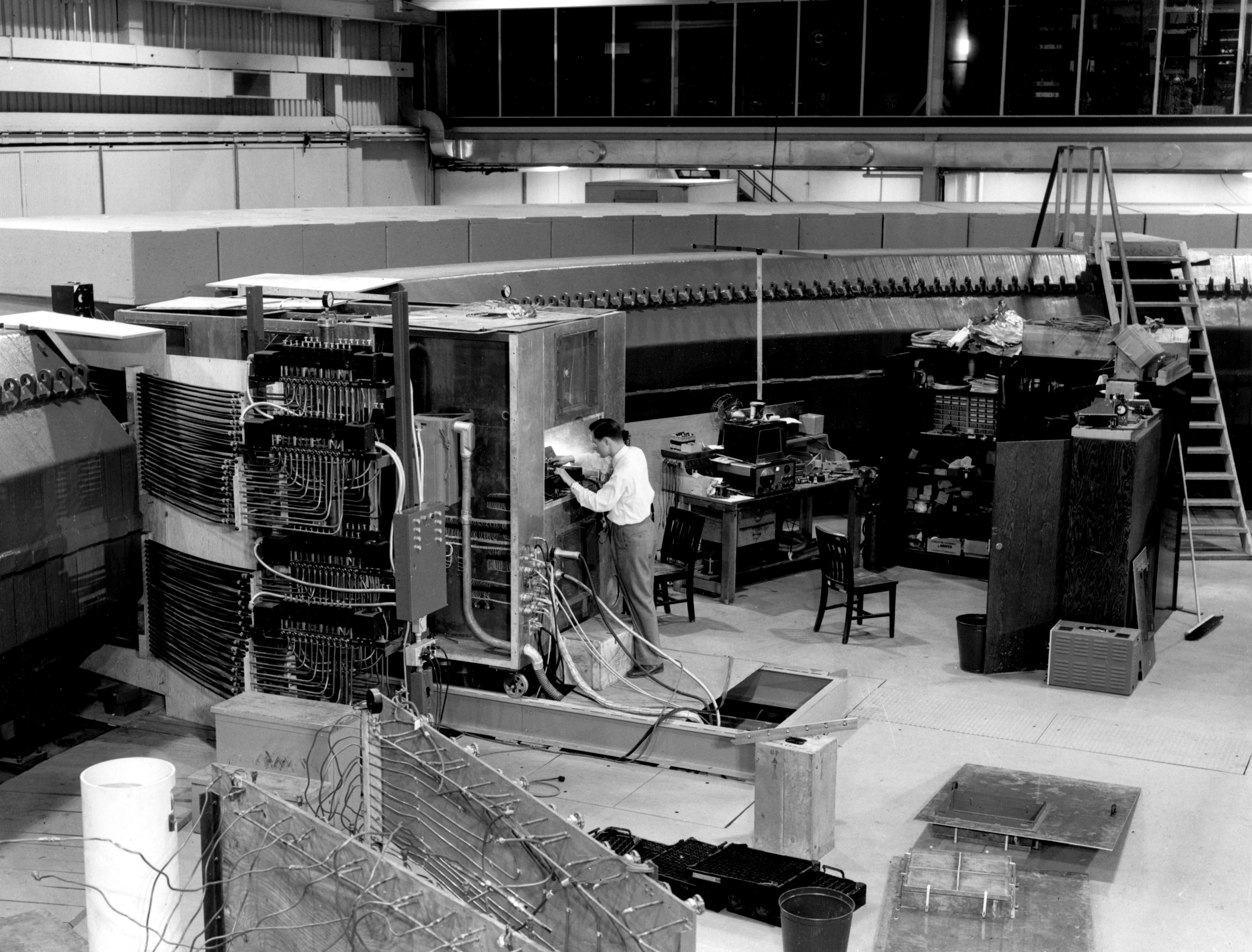
HD.6B.437 - A view of the inside of the Cosmotron ring showing engineer working or high level power amplifier. The orderly assembly of tubes and hoses to the left is a portion of the waterflow interlock system.

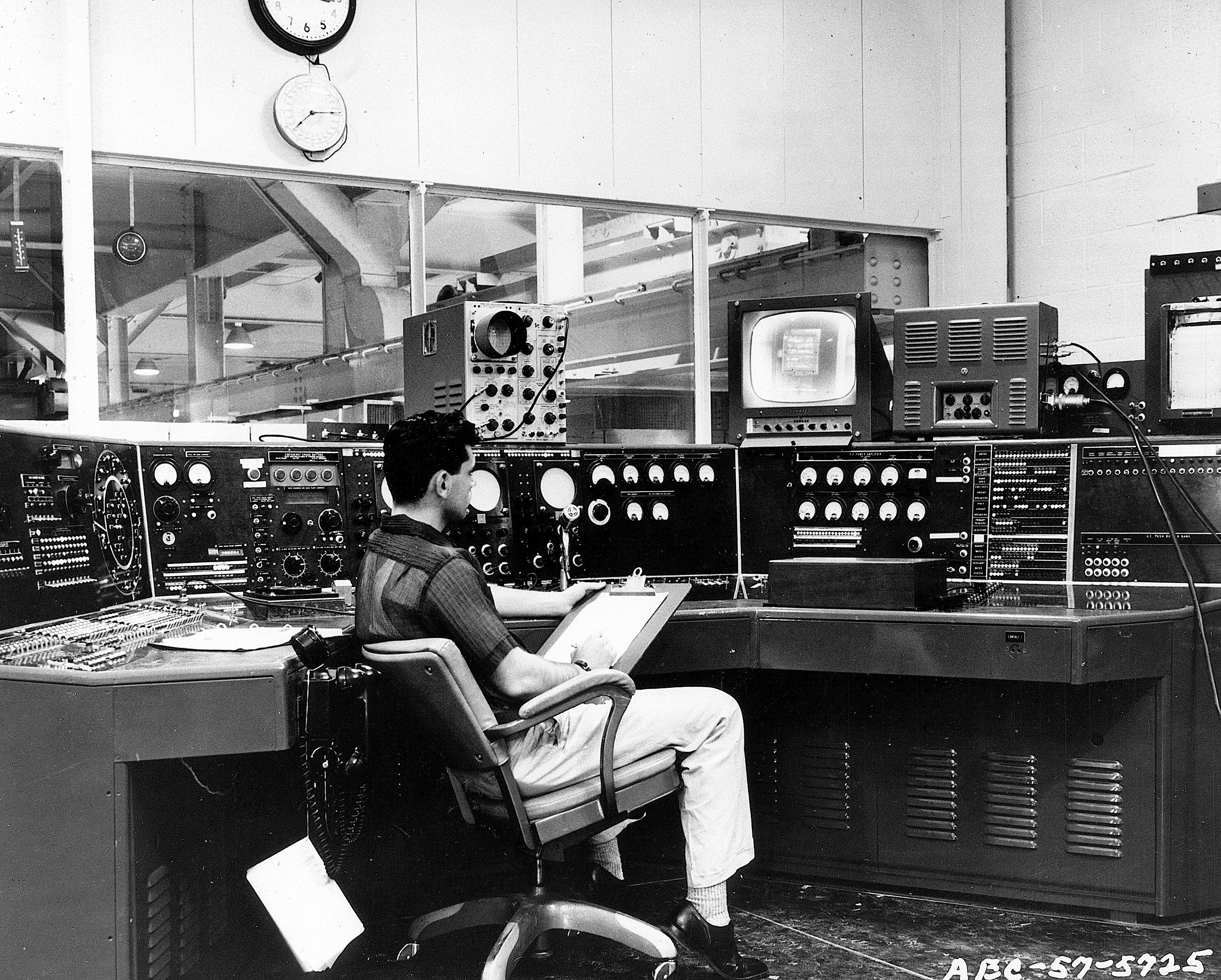
HD.6B.434 - Picture of Sodium Iodide Mosaic used to view 3 Billion Electron Volt External Proton Beam from Cosmotron appears on TV screen at remote monitoring station. c. 1957

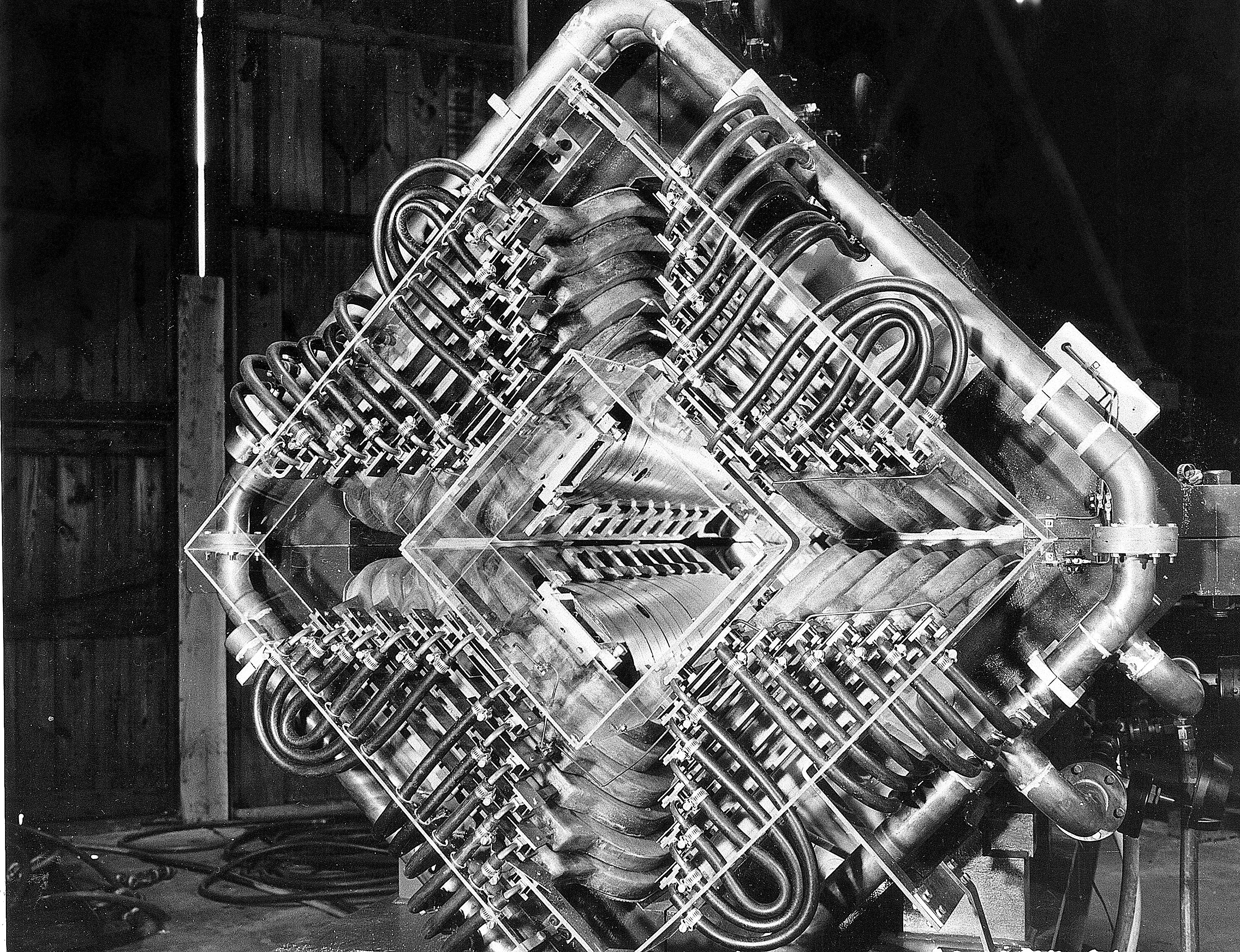
HD.6B.431 - Front view of the strong focusing magnet used to narrow down external beams of charged nuclear particles which emerge from the Cosmotron (not shown) at Brookhaven National Laboratory. c. 1957

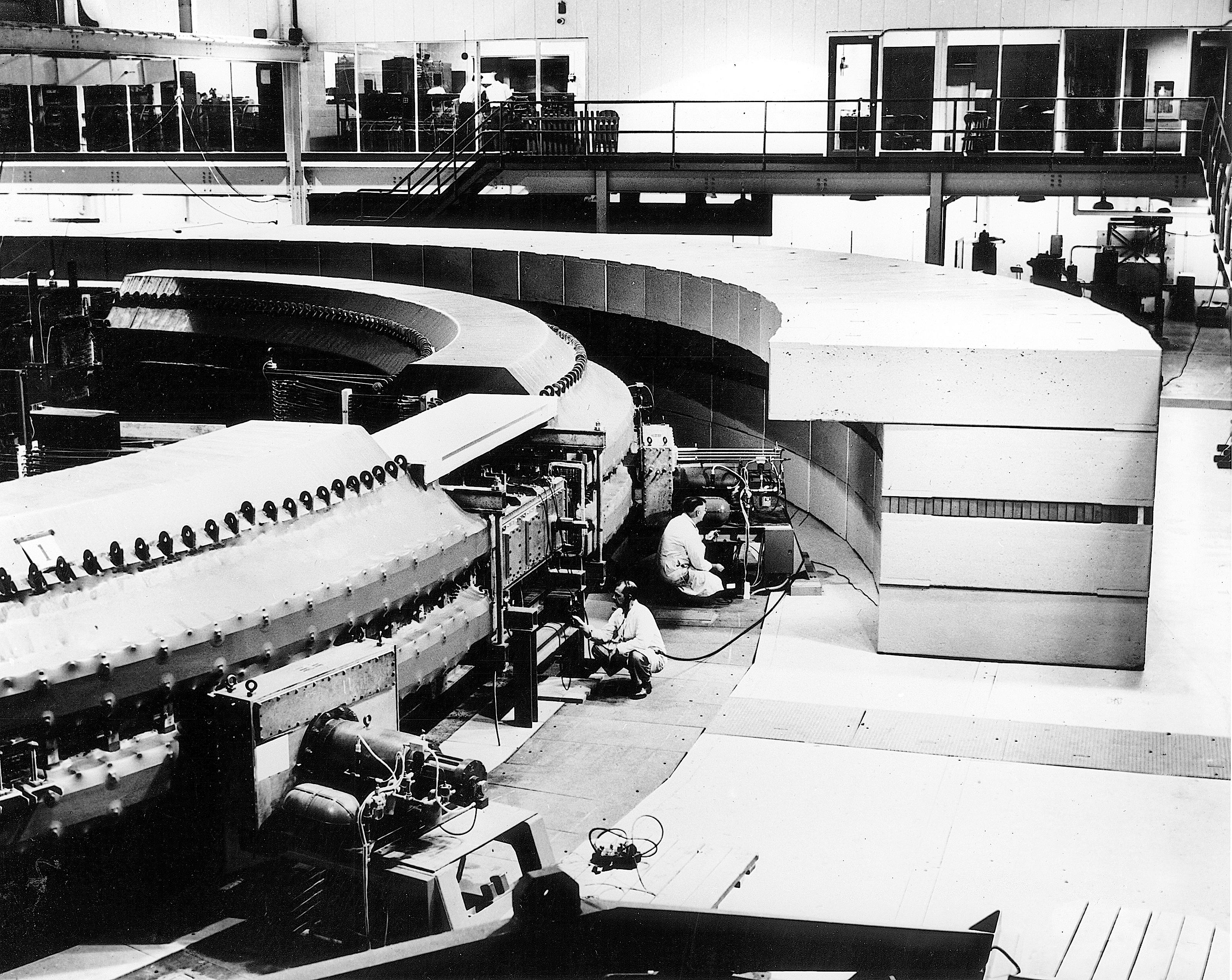
HD.6B.433 The 3 BEV Cosmotron at the Brookhaven National Laboratory. c. 1961
