= Weak focusing =

A particle bunch with position variance gets focused in a magnetic field. In reality, the beam will not get focused to a point, but keeps a finite spot size due to divergence.

Weak focusing occurs in particle accelerators when charged particles are passing through uniform magnetic fields, causing them to move in circular paths due to the Lorentz force. Because of the circular movement, the orbits of two particles with slightly different positions may approximate or even cross each other.

Because a particle beam has a finite emittance, this effect was used in cyclotrons and early synchrotrons to prevent the growth of deviations from the desired particle orbit. Due to its definition, it also occurs in the dipole magnets of modern accelerator facilities and must be considered in beam optics calculations. In modern facilities, most of the beam focusing is usually done by quadrupole magnets, using Strong focusing to enable smaller beam sizes and vacuum chambers, thus reducing the average magnet size.
