= Ernest Courant =

American physicist (1920–2020)

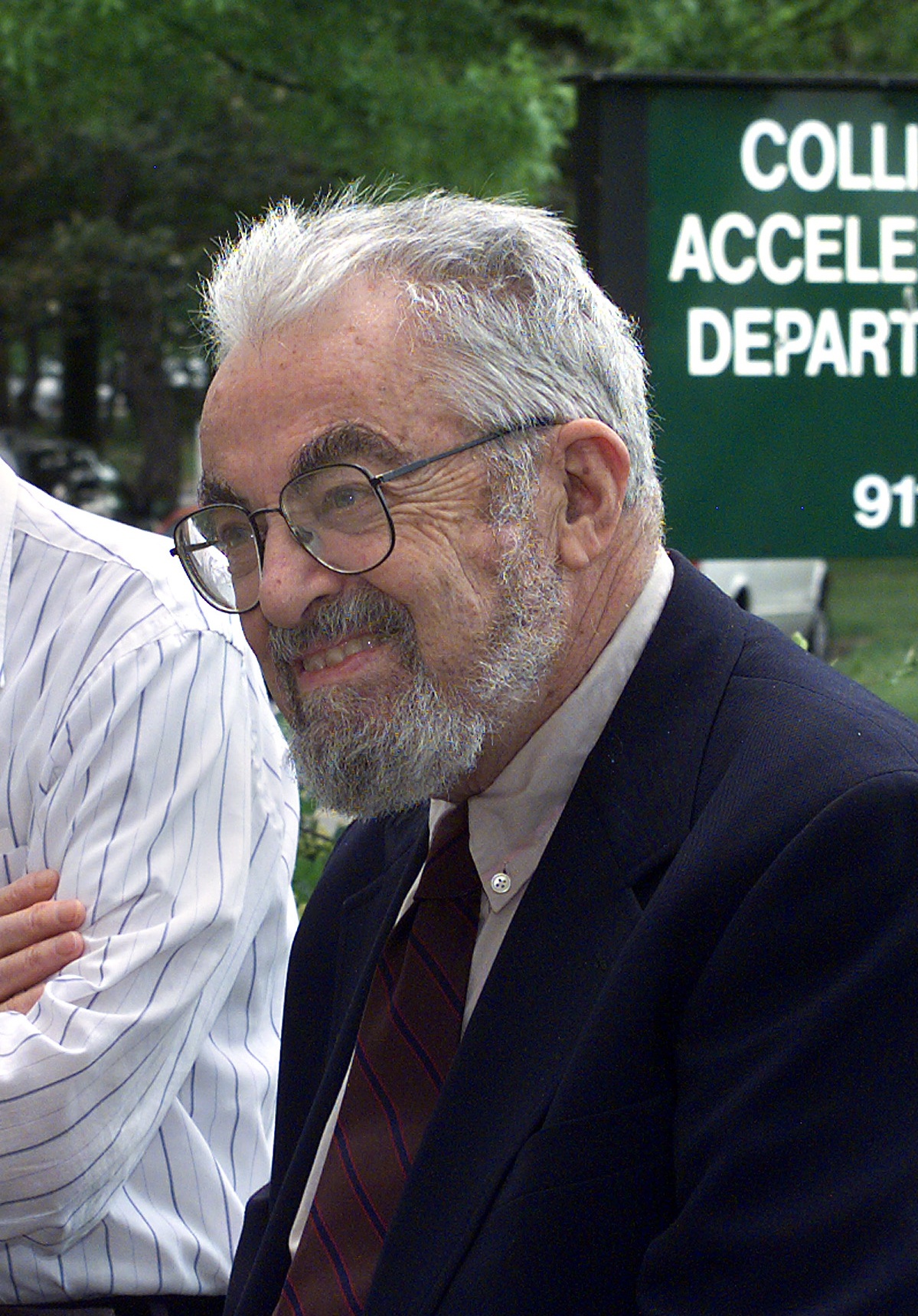
- Courant in 2000
- Born: Ernest David Courant; March 26, 1920; Göttingen, Free State of Prussia, Weimar Republic (now in Lower Saxony, Germany)
- Died: April 21, 2020 (aged 100); Ann Arbor, Michigan, U.S.
- Education: Swarthmore College; University of Rochester
- Known for: Strong focusing
- Father: Richard Courant
- Awards: Enrico Fermi Award (1986)
- Scientific career
- Fields: Accelerator physics
- Workplaces: Brookhaven National Laboratory; University of Michigan
- Doctoral advisor: Victor Weisskopf

Ernest David Courant (March 26, 1920 – April 21, 2020) was an American accelerator physicist. He was a distinguished scientist emeritus at Brookhaven National Laboratory and an adjunct professor at the University of Michigan. In 1976, he was elected to the National Academy of Sciences. Courant was the eldest son of the mathematician Richard Courant.

Courant was a fundamental contributor to modern large-scale particle accelerator concepts. His most notable discovery was his 1952 work with Milton S. Livingston and Hartland Snyder on the Strong focusing principle, a critical step in the development of modern particle accelerators like the synchrotron, though this work was preceded by that of Nicholas Christofilos. Courant was nominated for the Nobel Prize in Physics five times, each nomination being joint with Livingston, but they were never so honored.

== Early life ==
Ernest David Courant was born March 26, 1920, in Göttingen, Germany, the first of four children of Richard Courant and Nerina Runge Courant, a year after their marriage.

He wrote that he "came by science naturally". His mother's father, Carl Runge, is credited with the Runge–Kutta method for numerical solutions of differential equations. A maternal great-grandfather (Runge's father-in-law ) was Emil DuBois-Reymond, a pioneer in electrophysiology. Affinity for science and mathematics extended further than his biological family. Ernest Courant's childhood neighbors included the mathematician David Hilbert (his father's thesis director, in whose honor Ernest received the middle name of David) and the physicists Max Born and James Franck. Further, his father's students and colleagues became friends of the family, and often visited.

Ernest's early interests centered on chemistry. "I had a lab at home full of test tubes, Bunsen burners, and chemicals. Once there was a small fire (easily put out), but I got a sense of how things were put together."

Adolf Hitler came to power in 1933, and the neighborhood and its intellectual society were disrupted—along with the mathematics department at the university. Ernest's father had been born to a Jewish family of small businessmen, and he was now identified as a Jew, and an undesirable, by the new regime. Expelled from his position at the University of Göttingen, Richard Courant took a temporary teaching position in England, and the family abandoned Göttingen in favor of Cambridge for a few months. Forewarned by a Nazi acquaintance that the anti-Semitic storm would not settle but intensify, the family made plans to emigrate permanently. They returned only briefly to Germany before embarking to New York City, where his father had secured a post at New York University—and immigration visas to the US. Ernest became an American citizen in 1940.

Fluent in English from both early lessons and the recent months enrolled at the Perse School in Cambridge, Ernest was accepted at the Fieldston School in the Bronx, with a scholarship, thanks to intervention by family friend (and Fieldston alumnus), J. Robert Oppenheimer.

== Career ==
Courant graduated from the Fieldston School in 1936, received a physics degree from Swarthmore College in 1940, and earned a Ph.D. in physics from the University of Rochester in 1943 under Victor Weisskopf.

Courant worked at Brookhaven National Laboratory from 1948, first as an associate scientist in the Proton Synchrotron Division. He received tenure in 1955, and was promoted to senior scientist in 1960. In addition, he taught as an adjunct professor at Stony Brook University from 1966 to 1986.

Together with Hartland Snyder, he developed the Courant–Snyder parameters, a method for analyzing the distribution of particles in an accelerator or beam line.

Courant turned 100 in March 2020 and died the following month.

=== Honors ===
- 2007 University of Rochester distinguished scholar award
- 1987 First Annual Robert R. Wilson Prize of the American Physical Society
- 1986 Enrico Fermi Award from the Department of Energy, USA
- Boris Pregal Prize of the New York Academy of Sciences

== See also ==
- List of nominees for the Nobel Prize in Physics

== References and further reading ==
Courant, E. D. (December 1968). "Accelerators for High Intensities and High Energies". Annual Review of Nuclear Science. 18: 435–464. Bibcode:1968ARNPS..18..435C. doi:10.1146/annurev.ns.18.120168.002251. Chao, A.; Courant, E. (2007). "Spin echo in synchrotrons". Physical Review Special Topics: Accelerators and Beams. 10 (1) 014001. Bibcode:2007PhRvS..10a4001C. doi:10.1103/PhysRevSTAB.10.014001.
