= Tune shift with amplitude =

The tune shift with amplitude is an important concept in circular accelerators or synchrotrons. The machine may be described via a symplectic one turn map at each position, which may be thought of as the Poincaire section of the dynamics. A simple harmonic oscillator has a constant tune for all initial positions in phase space. Adding some non-linearity results in a variation of the tune with amplitude. Amplitude may refer to either the initial position, or more formally, the initial action of the particle.

== Definition ==
Consider dynamics in phase space. These dynamics are assumed to be determined by a Hamiltonian, or a symplectic map. For each initial position, we follow the particle as it traces out its orbit. After transformation into action-angle coordinates, one compute the tune $\nu$ and the action $J$. The tune shift with amplitude is then given by $\frac{d\nu}{dJ}$. The transformation to action-angle variables out of which the tune may be derived may be considered as a transformation to normal form.

== Significance ==
The tune shift with amplitude is important as a measure of non-linearity of a system. A linear system will have no tune shift with amplitude. Further, it can be important regarding the stability of the system. When the tune reaches resonant values, it can be unstable, and thus a tune-shift with amplitude can limit the stability region, or dynamic aperture.

== Examples of systems with tune shift with amplitude ==
In classical mechanics, a simple example of a system with tune shift with amplitude is a pendulum. In accelerator physics, both the transverse and the longitudinal dynamics show tune shift with amplitude. A simple model of the transverse dynamics is of an oscillator with a single sextupole, it is referred to as the Hénon map. Another model for this case is the Standard Map. An important example is the typical case of distributed sextupoles in a storage ring.

== Computation ==
The tune shift with amplitude may be computed in numerous ways. One involves the use of the normal form method. See for the use of this method for the pendulum. It may also be computed by tracking the orbit through phase space, and then Fourier transforming the projections onto the different planes. For computation in the Elegant code, see The tune may also be computed by a refinement over the Fourier transform method, called NAFF. e.g. It may also be computed analytically via a formula, using the normal form method, otherwise. For the storage ring case with distributed sextupoles, one can see

== See also ==
anharmonicity
