= Hartland Snyder =

American physicist (1913–1962)

- Born: Hartland Sweet Snyder; 1913; Salt Lake City, U.S.
- Died: May 22, 1962; Berkeley, California, U.S.
- Education: University of Utah (BS, 1937); University of California, Berkeley (PhD, 1940)
- Known for: Courant–Snyder parameters Oppenheimer–Snyder model Strong focusing
- Scientific career
- Fields: Theoretical physics
- Workplaces: Northwestern University; Brookhaven National Laboratory
- Doctoral advisor: J. Robert Oppenheimer

Hartland Sweet Snyder (1913 – May 22, 1962) was an American physicist. He is known for the Oppenheimer–Snyder model that showed how large stars would collapse to form black holes. The Courant–Snyder parameters and the principles of strong focusing are associated with him.

== Life and career ==
Snyder was born in Salt Lake City. He received a bachelor of science degree from the University of Utah in 1937, followed by a PhD from the University of California at Berkeley in 1940. His doctoral dissertation was supervised by J. Robert Oppenheimer. He served on the physics faculty at Northwestern University from 1940 to 1947, then joined Brookhaven National Laboratory.

In 1954, Snyder bet against Maurice Goldhaber that antiprotons existed, and won.

Snyder died May 22, 1962 after a heart attack. When he died, he was on leave from his position as a senior physicist at Brookhaven National Laboratory while working at the Lawrence Radiation Laboratory.

== Research ==
The Oppenheimer–Snyder model was devised by Snyder working with J. Robert Oppenheimer in 1939. They modeled the gravitational collapse of a pressure-free homogeneous fluid sphere and found that it would be unable to communicate with the rest of the universe. Historian of physics David C. Cassidy assessed that this prediction of black holes might have won a Nobel Prize in Physics had the authors been alive in the 1990s when evidence was available.

Some publications Snyder authored together with Ernest Courant laid the foundations for the field of accelerator physics. In particular, Snyder with Courant and Milton Stanley Livingston developed the principle of strong focusing that made modern particle accelerators possible. The Courant–Snyder parameters, a method of characterizing the distribution of particles in a beam, were an important part of that contribution.

== In popular media ==
The discovery of the Oppenheimer–Snyder mechanism was depicted in the 2023 movie Oppenheimer, where Snyder was portrayed by actor Rory Keane.

== See also ==
- Noncommutative quantum field theory
- Quantum spacetime
- Timeline of gravitational physics and relativity
