= Strong focusing =

Converging particle beams using alternating field gradients

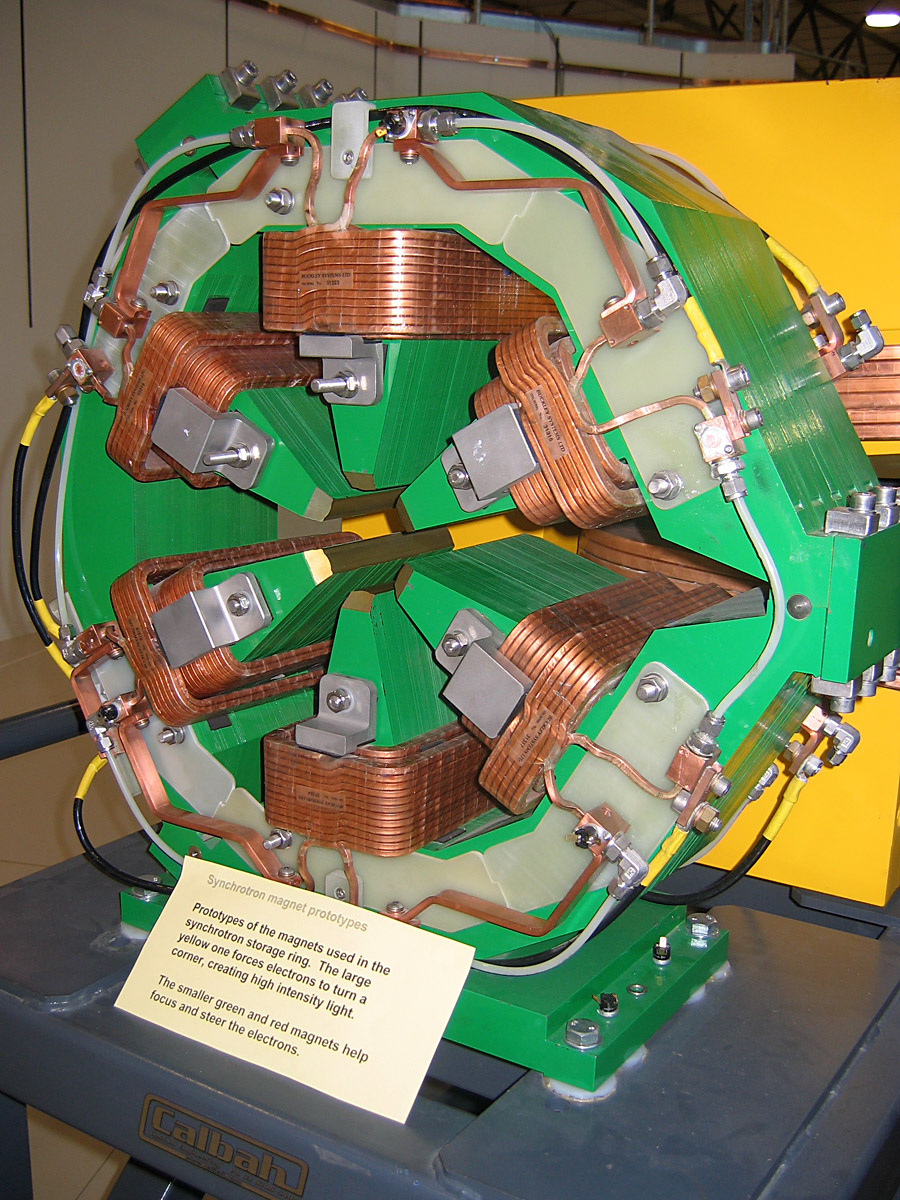
Sextupole electromagnet as used within the storage ring of the Australian Synchrotron to focus and steer the electron beam

In accelerator physics strong focusing or alternating-gradient focusing is the principle that, using sets of multiple electromagnets, it is possible to make a particle beam simultaneously converge in both directions perpendicular to the direction of travel. By contrast, weak focusing is the principle that nearby circles, described by charged particles moving in a uniform magnetic field, only intersect once per revolution.

Earnshaw's theorem shows that simultaneous focusing in two directions transverse to the beam axis at once by a single magnet is impossible - a magnet which focuses in one direction will defocus in the perpendicular direction. However, iron "poles" of a cyclotron or two or more spaced quadrupole magnets (arranged in quadrature) can alternately focus horizontally and vertically, and the net overall effect of a combination of these can be adjusted to focus the beam in both directions.

Strong focusing was first conceived by Nicholas Christofilos in 1949 but not published (Christofilos opted instead to patent his idea). In 1952, the strong focusing principle was independently developed by Ernest Courant, M. Stanley Livingston, Hartland Snyder and J. Blewett at Brookhaven National Laboratory, who later acknowledged the priority of Christofilos' idea. The advantages of strong focusing were then quickly realised, and deployed on the Alternating Gradient Synchrotron.

Courant and Snyder found that the net effect of alternating the field gradient was that both the vertical and horizontal focusing of protons could be made strong at the same time, allowing tight control of proton paths in the machine. This increased beam intensity while reducing the overall construction cost of a more powerful accelerator. The theory revolutionised cyclotron design and permitted very high field strengths to be employed, while massively reducing the size of the magnets needed by minimising the size of the beam. Most particle accelerators today use the strong-focusing principle.

== Multipole magnets ==
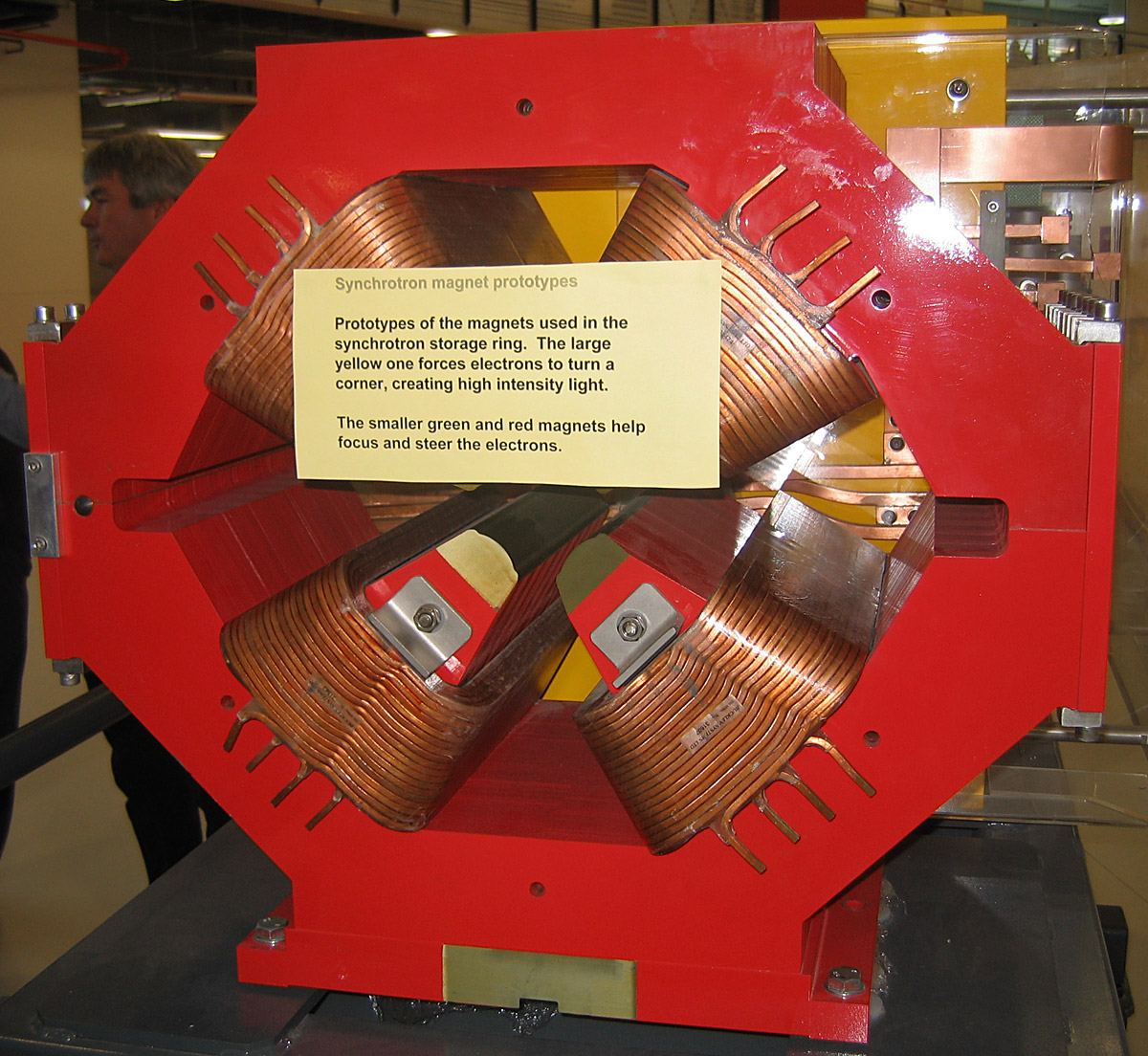
Quadrupole electromagnet from the storage ring of the Australian Synchrotron serves much the same purpose as the sextupole magnets.

Modern systems often use multipole magnets, such as quadrupole and sextupole magnets, to focus the beam down, as magnets give a more powerful deflection effect than earlier electrostatic systems at high beam kinetic energies. The multipole magnets refocus the beam after each deflection section, as deflection sections have a defocusing effect that can be countered with a convergent magnet 'lens'.

This can be shown schematically as a sequence of divergent and convergent lenses. The quadrupoles are often laid out in what are called FODO patterns (where F focuses vertically and defocuses horizontally, and D focuses horizontally and defocuses vertically and O is a space or deflection magnet). Following the beam particles in their trajectories through the focusing arrangement, an oscillating pattern would be seen.

== Mathematical modeling ==
The action upon a set of charged particles by a set of linear magnets (i.e. only dipoles, quadrupoles and the field-free drift regions between them) can be expressed as matrices which can be multiplied together to give their net effect, using ray transfer matrix analysis. Higher-order terms such as sextupoles, octupoles etc. may be treated by a variety of methods, depending on the phenomena of interest.

== See also ==
- Electron gun – uses cylindrical symmetric fields such as provided by a Wehnelt cylinder to focus an electron beam
- Maglev – has also been a suggested use of strong focusing
