= Accelerator physics =

Physics related to the study, design, building and operation of particle accelerators

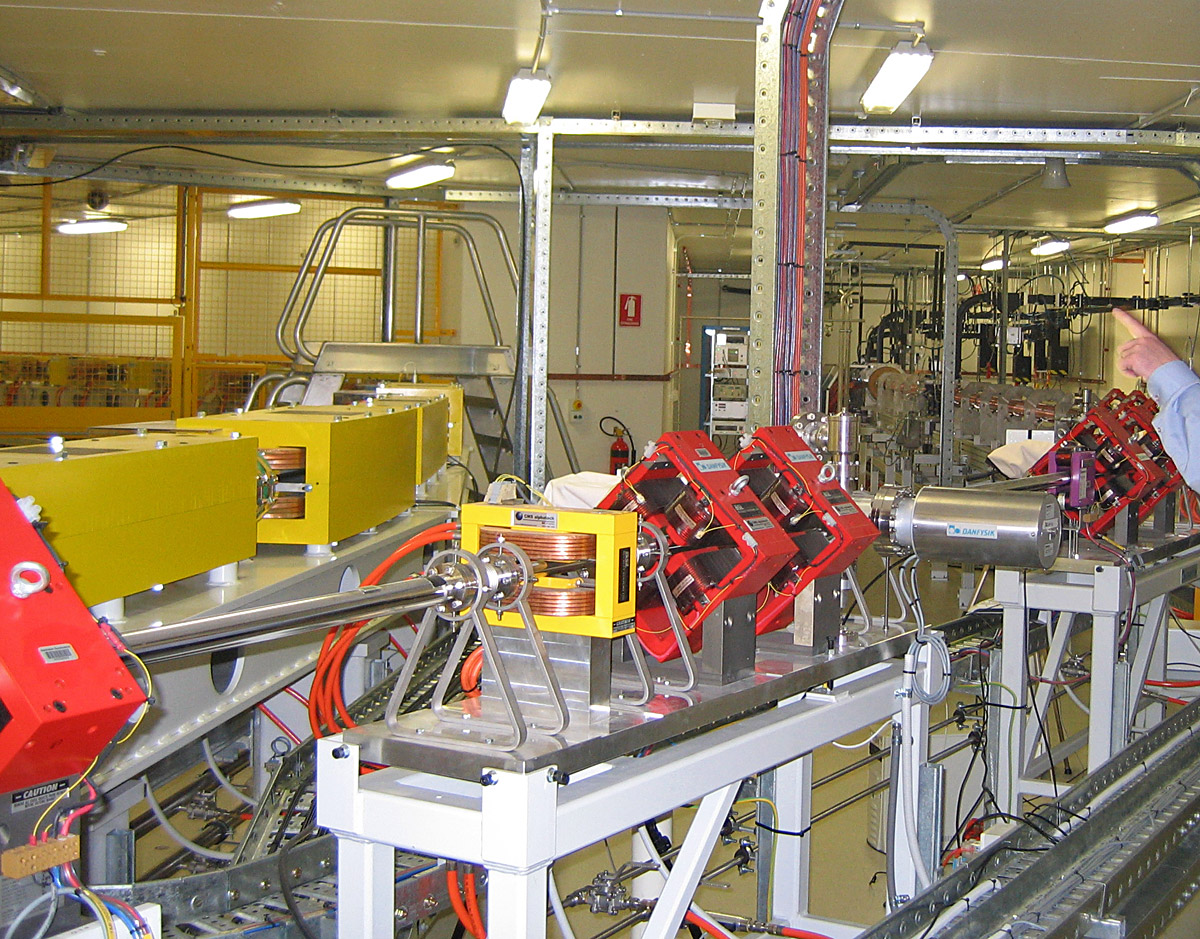
The linear accelerator (linac) and booster ring at the Australian Synchrotron in Clayton, Victoria. Their operation illustrates fundamental principles of accelerator physics, including electromagnetic acceleration and magnetic beam steering, implemented through radio-frequency cavities and bending magnets.

Accelerator physics is a branch of applied physics concerned with the physical principles governing the acceleration and controlled motion of charged particles and the dynamics of particle beams in particle accelerators. It encompasses the study of particle motion, manipulation and measurement, and the interactions of charged particle beams with electromagnetic fields and accelerator structures. Its theoretical foundations draw on classical mechanics, special relativity, electromagnetism and statistical mechanics, and include the study of both individual particle dynamics and the collective behaviour of beams.

A central area of accelerator physics is beam dynamics, which describes the motion and behaviour of particles within an accelerator. It includes beam optics, concerned with the focusing, bending and transport of particle beams through accelerator elements, and the transverse and longitudinal motion of individual particles. These motions are studied using concepts from dynamical systems and nonlinear physics, including particle stability, resonances and the evolution of beams in phase space. Accelerator physics also examines collective effects arising from interactions among particles and between beams and their surroundings, such as space-charge forces, beam–beam interactions and wake fields, which can produce beam instabilities. The control of beam properties, including emittance and energy spread, is another important concern, with techniques such as beam cooling and damping used to improve beam quality. The field also encompasses synchrotron radiation, emitted when relativistic charged particles are deflected along curved trajectories, and its applications in accelerator facilities.

Research in accelerator physics contributes to the development and improvement of particle accelerators. These include radio-frequency structures, magnets, vacuum systems, particle sources and beam instrumentation. It is also related to several other fields: beam physics, which studies particle beams in a wider range of physical systems; microwave engineering, for the development of acceleration and deflection structures operating in the radio frequency range; optics, particularly geometrical optics, which provides a framework for understanding beam focusing and bending; laser physics, which concerns interactions between lasers and particle beams; computer technology, particularly digital signal processing, used in beam measurement and automated control; and plasma physics, which provides methods for describing intense beams and their collective behaviour.

Experiments conducted using particle accelerators are generally not considered part of accelerator physics itself, but belong, according to their objectives, to fields such as particle physics, nuclear physics, condensed matter physics and materials physics. The types of experiments conducted at a particular accelerator facility depend on the characteristics of the generated particle beam, including its average energy, particle type, intensity and dimensions. Particle accelerators also serve applications beyond fundamental physics research, including the production of synchrotron radiation for scientific investigations and uses in medicine and industry.

== Acceleration and interaction of particles with RF structures ==
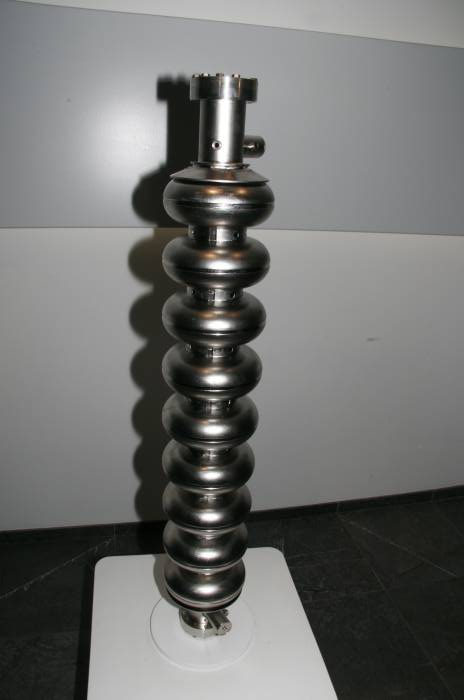
Superconducting 67 niobium cavity for acceleration of ultrarelativistic particles from the TESLA project

While it is possible to accelerate charged particles using electrostatic fields, like in a Cockcroft-Walton voltage multiplier, this method has limits given by electrical breakdown at high voltages. Furthermore, due to electrostatic fields being conservative, the maximum voltage limits the kinetic energy that is applicable to the particles.

To circumvent this problem, linear particle accelerators operate using time-varying fields. To control this fields using hollow macroscopic structures through which the particles are passing (wavelength restrictions), the frequency of such acceleration fields is located in the radio frequency region of the electromagnetic spectrum.

The space around a particle beam is evacuated to prevent scattering with gas atoms, requiring it to be enclosed in a vacuum chamber (or beam pipe). Due to the strong electromagnetic fields that follow the beam, it is possible for it to interact with any electrical impedance in the walls of the beam pipe. This may be in the form of a resistive impedance (i.e., the finite resistivity of the beam pipe material) or an inductive/capacitive impedance (due to the geometric changes in the beam pipe's cross section).

These impedances will induce wakefields (a strong warping of the electromagnetic field of the beam) that can interact with later particles. Since this interaction may have negative effects, it is studied to determine its magnitude, and to determine any actions that may be taken to mitigate it.

== Beam dynamics ==
Due to the high velocity of the particles, and the resulting Lorentz force for magnetic fields, adjustments to the beam direction are mainly controlled by magnetostatic fields that deflect particles. In most accelerator concepts (excluding compact structures like the cyclotron or betatron), these are applied by dedicated electromagnets with different properties and functions. An important step in the development of these types of accelerators was the understanding of strong focusing. Dipole magnets are used to guide the beam through the structure, while quadrupole magnets are used for beam focusing, and sextupole magnets are used for correction of dispersion effects.

A particle on the exact design trajectory (or design orbit) of the accelerator only experiences dipole field components, while particles with transverse position deviation $x(s)$ are re-focused to the design orbit. For preliminary calculations, neglecting all fields components higher than quadrupolar, an inhomogenic Hill differential equation

$$\frac{d^2}{ds^2}\,x(s) + k(s)\,x(s) = \frac{1}{\rho} \, \frac{\Delta p}{p}$$

can be used as an approximation, with

a non-constant focusing force $k(s)$, including strong focusing and weak focusing effects
the relative deviation from the design beam impulse $\Delta p / p$
the trajectory radius of curvature $\rho$, and
the design path length $s$,

thus identifying the system as a parametric oscillator. Beam parameters for the accelerator can then be calculated using Ray transfer matrix analysis; e.g., a quadrupolar field is analogous to a lens in geometrical optics, having similar properties regarding beam focusing (but obeying Earnshaw's theorem).

The general equations of motion originate from relativistic Hamiltonian mechanics, in almost all cases using the Paraxial approximation. Even in the cases of strongly nonlinear magnetic fields, and without the paraxial approximation, a Lie transform may be used to construct an integrator with a high degree of accuracy.

== Modeling Codes ==
There are many different software packages available for modeling the different aspects of accelerator physics. One must model the elements that create the electric and magnetic fields, and then one must model the charged particle evolution within those fields.

== Beam diagnostics ==
A vital component of any accelerator are the diagnostic devices that allow various properties of the particle bunches to be measured.

A typical machine may use many different types of measurement device in order to measure different properties. These include (but are not limited to) Beam Position Monitors (BPMs) to measure the position of the bunch, screens (fluorescent screens, Optical Transition Radiation (OTR) devices) to image the profile of the bunch, wire-scanners to measure its cross-section, and toroids or ICTs to measure the bunch charge (i.e., the number of particles per bunch).

While many of these devices rely on well understood technology, designing a device capable of measuring a beam for a particular machine is a task requiring much experience. Both a complete understanding of the physics of the operation of the device and assurance that the device is capable of measuring the expected parameters of the machine are necessary.

Success of the full range of beam diagnostics often underpins the success of the machine as a whole.

== Machine tolerances ==
Errors in the alignment of components, field strength, etc., are inevitable in machines of this scale, so it is important to consider the tolerances under which a machine may operate.

Engineers will provide the physicists with expected tolerances for the alignment and manufacture of each component to allow full physics simulations of the expected behaviour of the machine under these conditions. In many cases it will be found that the performance is degraded to an unacceptable level, requiring either re-engineering of the components, or the invention of algorithms that allow the machine performance to be 'tuned' back to the design level.

This may require many simulations of different error conditions in order to determine the relative success of each tuning algorithm, and to allow recommendations for the collection of algorithms to be deployed on the real machine.

== See also ==
- Particle accelerator
- Significant publications for accelerator physics
- Category:Accelerator physics
- Category:Accelerator physicists
- Category:Particle accelerators
