= Atom smasher (disambiguation) =

An atom smasher is a colloquial term for a particle accelerator.

Atom smasher may also refer to:

- Atom-Smasher (Marvel Comics), two Marvel Comics characters
- Atom Smasher (DC Comics) , a DC Comics superhero
- Westinghouse Atom Smasher, a former electrostatic nuclear accelerator
- Phantomsmasher, American experimental band formerly known as Atomsmasher
