= Momentum compaction =

The momentum compaction or momentum compaction factor is a measure for the momentum dependence of the recirculation path length for an object that is bound in cyclic motion (closed orbit). It is used in the calculation of particle paths in circular particle accelerators (like synchrotrons), and for astronomical objects that are bound by gravitation.

For a perturbed orbit, the momentum compaction factor is defined as the derivative of normalized path length difference to normalized momentum

$\alpha_p = \frac{\mathrm{d}L / L} {\mathrm{d}p / p} = \frac{p}{L} \frac{\mathrm{d}L}{\mathrm{d}p} =\frac{1}{L} \oint \frac{D_{x}(s)}{\rho(s)}\mathrm{d}s$.

Furthermore, the momentum compaction is closely connected to the so-called slip-factor $\eta$ with the horizontal dispersion $D_x$ and the gyroradius $\rho$

$\alpha_p = \frac{1}{\gamma^{2}}+\eta$

wherein $\gamma$ is the Lorentz factor.
