= Particle accelerator =

Research apparatus for particle physics

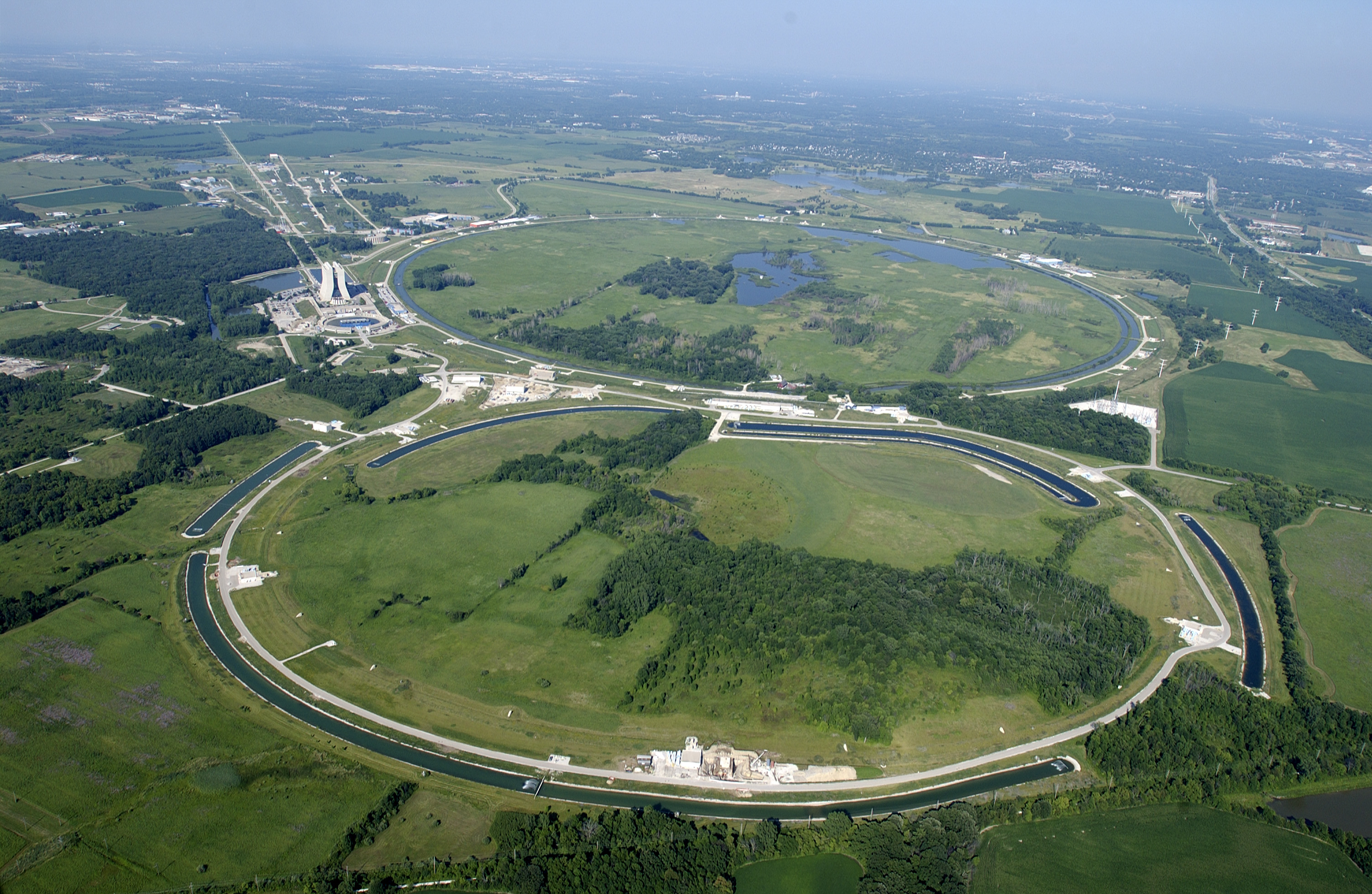
The Tevatron (background circle), a synchrotron collider type particle accelerator at Fermi National Accelerator Laboratory (Fermilab), Batavia, Illinois, USA. Shut down in 2011, it was the most powerful particle accelerator in the world until 2007, accelerating protons to an energy of over 1 TeV (tera electron volts). Beams of protons and antiprotons, circulating in opposite directions in the rear ring, collided at two magnetically induced intersection points.

Animation showing the operation of a linear accelerator, widely used in both physics research and cancer treatment.

A particle accelerator is a machine that uses electromagnetic fields to propel ions to very high speeds and energies to contain them in well-defined beams. Small accelerators are used for fundamental research in particle physics. Accelerators are also used as synchrotron light sources for the study of condensed matter physics. Smaller particle accelerators are used in a wide variety of applications, including particle therapy for oncological purposes, radioisotope production for medical diagnostics, ion implanters for the manufacture of semiconductors, and accelerator mass spectrometers for measurements of rare isotopes such as radiocarbon.

Large accelerators include the Relativistic Heavy Ion Collider at Brookhaven National Laboratory in New York and the largest accelerator, the Large Hadron Collider near Geneva, Switzerland, operated by CERN. It is a collider accelerator, which can accelerate two beams of protons to an energy of 6.5 TeV and cause them to collide head-on, creating center-of-mass energies of 13 TeV. There are more than 30,000 accelerators in operation around the world.

There are two basic classes of accelerators: electrostatic and electrodynamic (or electromagnetic) accelerators. Electrostatic particle accelerators use static electric fields to accelerate particles. The most common types are the Cockcroft–Walton generator and the Van de Graaff generator. A small-scale example of this class is the cathode-ray tube in an ordinary old television set. The achievable kinetic energy for particles in these devices is determined by the accelerating voltage, which is limited by electrical breakdown. Electrodynamic or electromagnetic accelerators, on the other hand, use changing electromagnetic fields (either magnetic induction or oscillating radio frequency fields) to accelerate particles. Since in these types the particles can pass through the same accelerating field multiple times, the output energy is not limited by the strength of the accelerating field. This class, which was first developed in the 1920s, is the basis for most modern large-scale accelerators.

Rolf Widerøe, Gustav Ising, Leó Szilárd, Max Steenbeck, and Ernest Lawrence are considered pioneers of this field, having conceived and built the first operational linear particle accelerator, the betatron, as well as the cyclotron. Because the target of the particle beams of early accelerators was usually the atoms of a piece of matter, with the goal being to create collisions with their nuclei in order to investigate nuclear structure, accelerators were commonly referred to as atom smashers in the 20th century. The term persists despite the fact that many modern accelerators create collisions between two subatomic particles, rather than a particle and an atomic nucleus.

== Uses ==
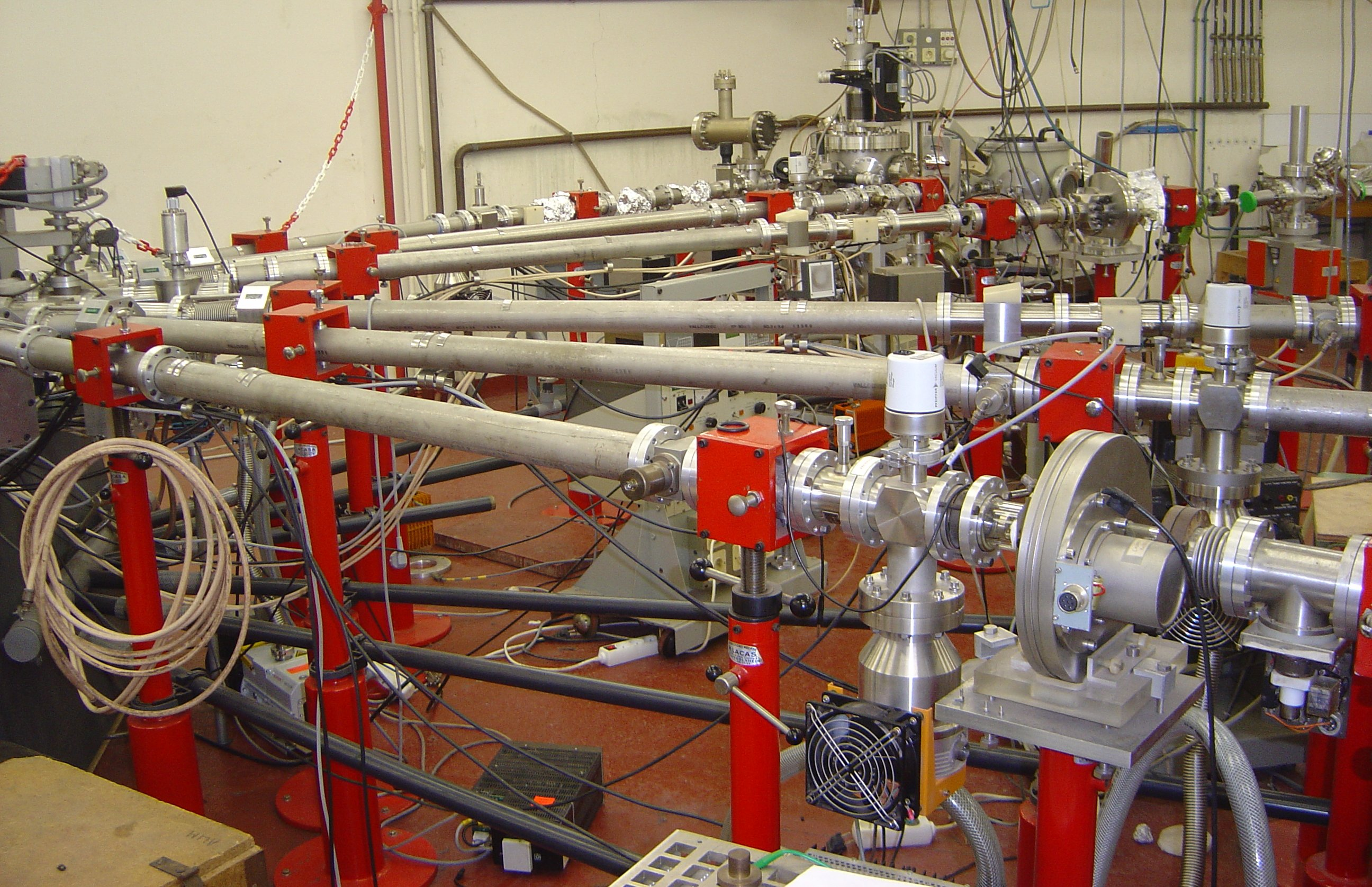
Beamlines leading from the Van de Graaff accelerator to various experiments, in the basement of the Jussieu Campus in Paris.

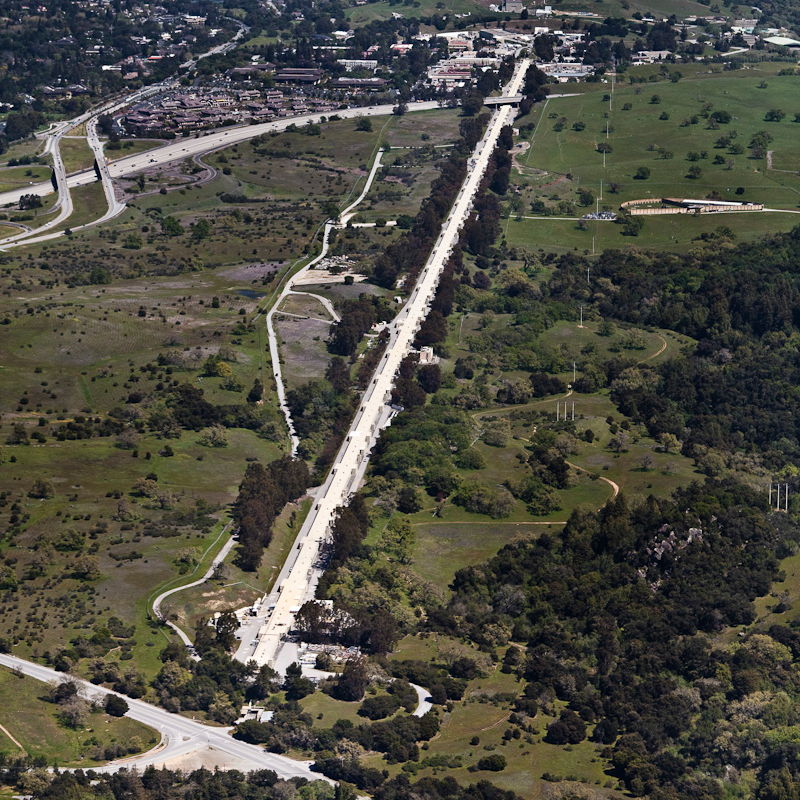
Building covering the 2 mile (3.2 km) beam tube of the Stanford Linear Accelerator (SLAC) at Menlo Park, California, the second most powerful linac in the world.

Beams of high-energy particles are useful for fundamental and applied research in the sciences and also in many technical and industrial fields unrelated to fundamental research. There are approximately 30,000 accelerators worldwide; of these, only about 1% are research machines with energies above 1 GeV, while about 44% are for radiotherapy, 41% for ion implantation, 9% for industrial processing and research, and 4% for biomedical and other low-energy research.

=== Particle physics ===
For the most basic inquiries into the dynamics and structure of matter, space, and time, physicists seek the simplest kinds of interactions at the highest possible energies. These typically entail particle energies of many GeV, and interactions of the simplest kinds of particles: leptons (e.g. electrons and positrons) and quarks for the matter, or photons and gluons for the field quanta. Since isolated quarks are experimentally unavailable due to color confinement, the simplest available experiments involve the interactions of, first, leptons with each other, and second, of leptons with nucleons, which are composed of quarks and gluons. To study the collisions of quarks with each other, scientists resort to collisions of nucleons, which at high energy may be usefully considered as essentially 2-body interactions of the quarks and gluons of which they are composed. This elementary particle physicists tend to use machines creating beams of electrons, positrons, protons, and antiprotons, interacting with each other or with the simplest nuclei (e.g., hydrogen or deuterium) at the highest possible energies, generally hundreds of GeV or more.

The largest and highest-energy particle accelerator used for elementary particle physics is the Large Hadron Collider (LHC) at CERN, operating since 2009.

=== Nuclear physics and isotope production ===
Nuclear physicists and cosmologists may use beams of bare atomic nuclei, stripped of electrons, to investigate the structure, interactions, and properties of the nuclei themselves, and of condensed matter at extremely high temperatures and densities, such as might have occurred in the first moments of the Big Bang. These investigations often involve collisions of heavy nuclei – of atoms like iron or gold – at energies of several GeV per nucleon. The largest such particle accelerator is the Relativistic Heavy Ion Collider (RHIC) at Brookhaven National Laboratory.

Particle accelerators can also produce proton beams, which can produce proton-rich medical or research isotopes as opposed to the neutron-rich ones made in fission reactors; however, recent work has shown how to make ^{99}Mo, usually made in reactors, by accelerating isotopes of hydrogen, although this method still requires a reactor to produce tritium. An example of this type of machine is LANSCE at Los Alamos National Laboratory.

=== Synchrotron radiation ===
Electrons propagating through a magnetic field emit very bright and coherent photon beams via synchrotron radiation. It has numerous uses in the study of atomic structure, chemistry, condensed matter physics, biology, and technology. A large number of synchrotron light sources exist worldwide. Examples in the U.S. are SSRL at SLAC National Accelerator Laboratory, APS at Argonne National Laboratory, ALS at Lawrence Berkeley National Laboratory, and NSLS-II at Brookhaven National Laboratory. In Europe, there are MAX IV in Lund, Sweden, BESSY in Berlin, Germany, Diamond in Oxfordshire, UK, ESRF in Grenoble, France, the latter has been used to extract detailed 3-dimensional images of insects trapped in amber.

Free-electron lasers (FELs) are a special class of light sources based on synchrotron radiation that provides shorter pulses with higher temporal coherence. A specially designed FEL is the most brilliant source of x-rays in the observable universe. The most prominent examples are the LCLS in the U.S. and European XFEL in Germany. More attention is being drawn towards soft x-ray lasers, which together with pulse shortening opens up new methods for attosecond science. Apart from x-rays, FELs are used to emit terahertz light, e.g. FELIX in Nijmegen, Netherlands, TELBE in Dresden, Germany and NovoFEL in Novosibirsk, Russia.

Thus there is a great demand for electron accelerators of moderate (GeV) energy, high intensity and high beam quality to drive light sources.

=== Low-energy machines and particle therapy ===
Everyday examples of particle accelerators are cathode ray tubes found in television sets and X-ray generators. These low-energy accelerators use a single pair of electrodes with a DC voltage of a few thousand volts between them. In an X-ray generator, the target itself is one of the electrodes. A low-energy particle accelerator called an ion implanter is used in the manufacture of integrated circuits.

At lower energies, beams of accelerated nuclei are also used in medicine as particle therapy, for the treatment of cancer.

DC accelerator types capable of accelerating particles to speeds sufficient to cause nuclear reactions are Cockcroft–Walton generators or voltage multipliers, which convert AC to high voltage DC, or Van de Graaff generators that use static electricity carried by belts.

=== Radiation sterilization of medical devices ===
Electron beam processing is commonly used for sterilization. Electron beams are an on-off technology that provide a much higher dose rate than gamma or X-rays emitted by radioisotopes like cobalt-60 (^{60}Co) or caesium-137 (^{137}Cs). Due to the higher dose rate, less exposure time is required and polymer degradation is reduced. Because electrons carry a charge, electron beams are less penetrating than both gamma and X-rays.

== Electrostatic particle accelerators ==
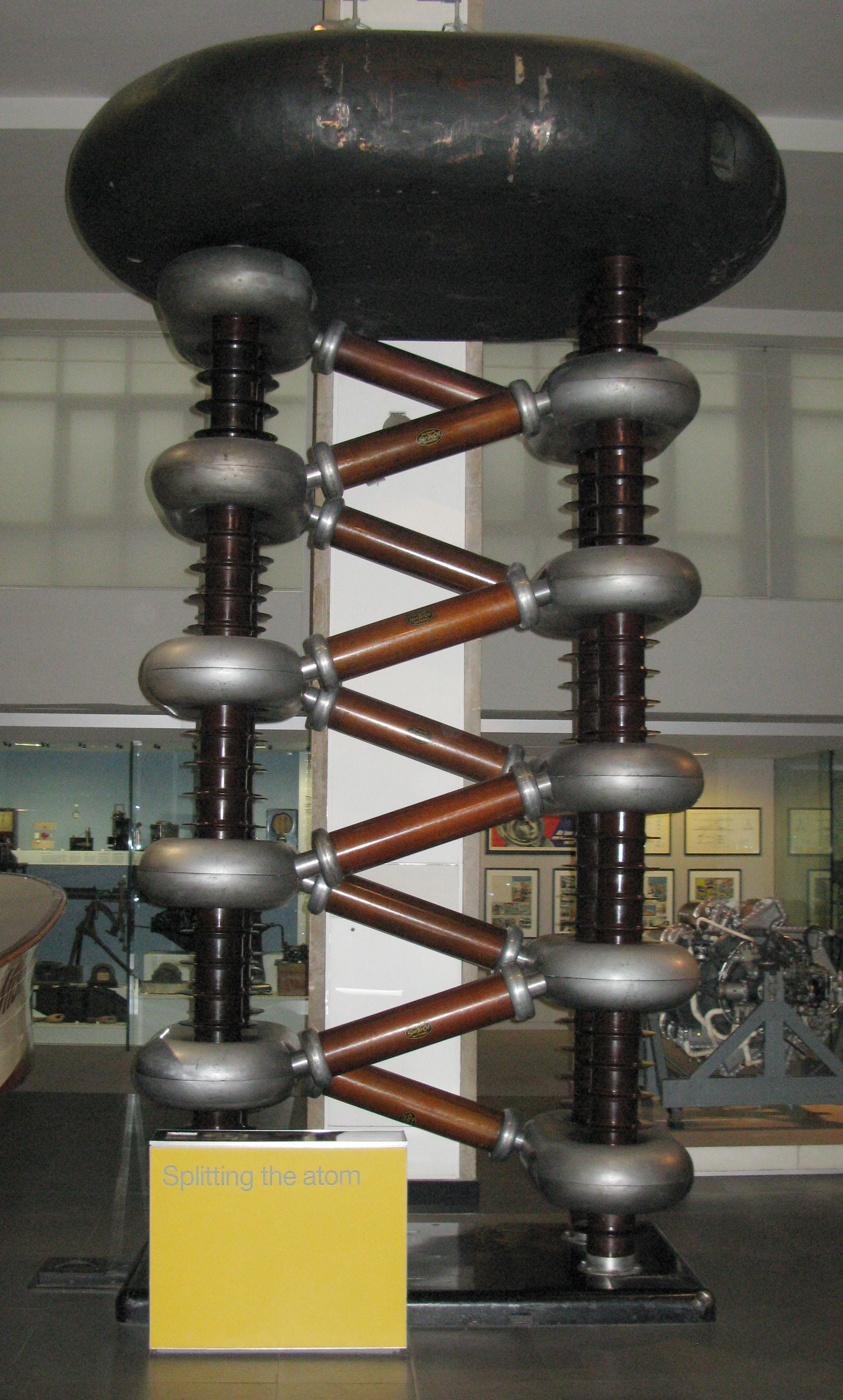
A Cockcroft–Walton generator (Philips, 1937), residing in Science Museum (London).

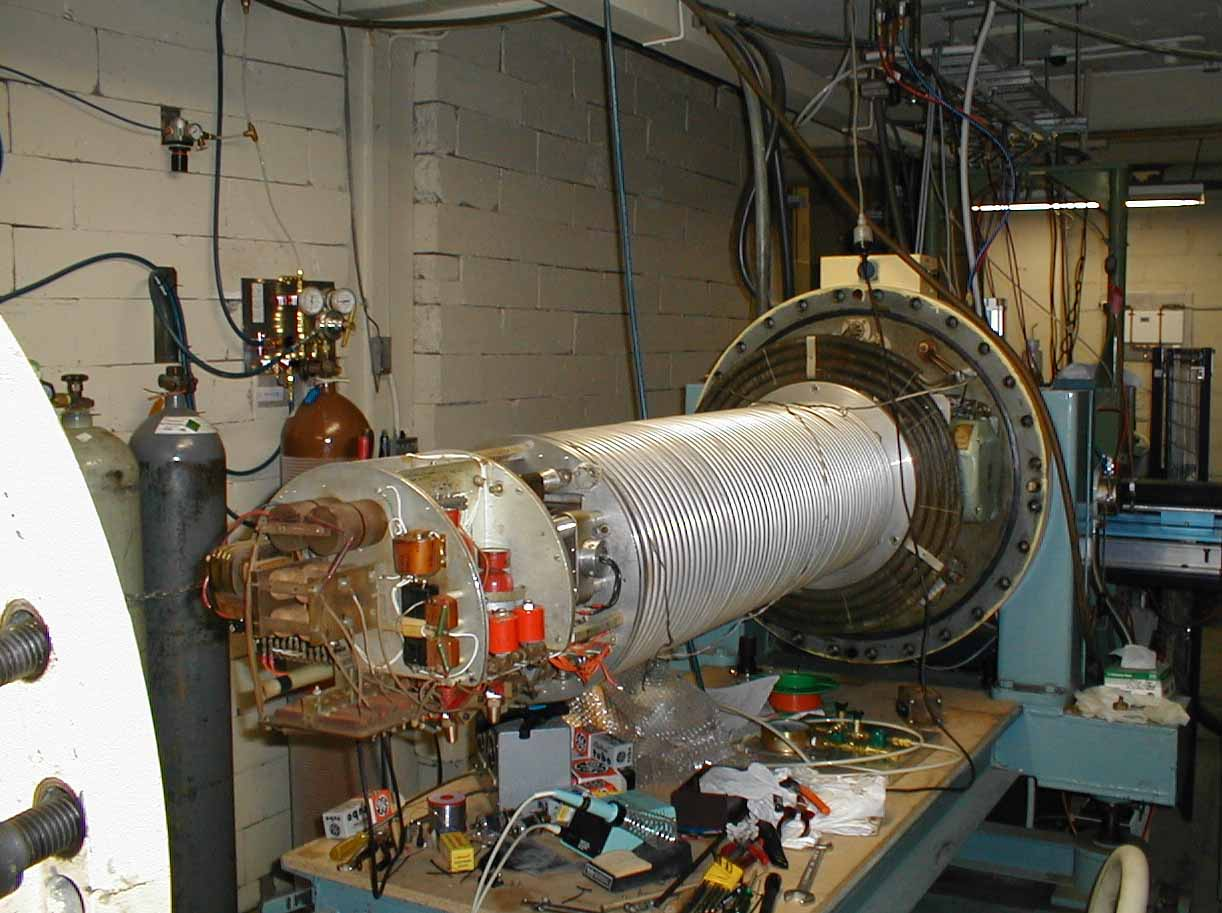
A 1960s single stage 2 MeV linear Van de Graaff accelerator, here opened for maintenance

Historically, the first accelerators used simple technology of a single static high voltage to accelerate charged particles. The charged particle was accelerated through an evacuated tube with an electrode at either end, with the static potential across it. Since the particle passed only once through the potential difference, the output energy was limited to the accelerating voltage of the machine. While this method is still extremely popular today, with the electrostatic accelerators greatly out-numbering any other type, they are more suited to lower energy studies owing to the practical voltage limit of about 1 MV for air insulated machines, or 30 MV when the accelerator is operated in a tank of pressurized gas with high dielectric strength, such as sulfur hexafluoride. In a tandem accelerator the potential is used twice to accelerate the particles, by reversing the charge of the particles while they are inside the terminal. This is possible with the acceleration of atomic nuclei by using anions (negatively charged ions), and then passing the beam through a thin foil to strip electrons off the anions inside the high voltage terminal, converting them to cations (positively charged ions), which are accelerated again as they leave the terminal.

The two main types of electrostatic accelerator are the Cockcroft–Walton accelerator, which uses a diode-capacitor voltage multiplier to produce high voltage, and the Van de Graaff accelerator, which uses a moving fabric belt to carry charge to the high voltage electrode. Although electrostatic accelerators accelerate particles along a straight line, the term linear accelerator is more often used for accelerators that employ oscillating rather than static electric fields.

== Electrodynamic (electromagnetic) particle accelerators ==
Due to the high voltage ceiling imposed by electrical discharge, in order to accelerate particles to higher energies, techniques involving dynamic fields rather than static fields are used. Electrodynamic acceleration can arise from either of two mechanisms: non-resonant magnetic induction, or resonant circuits or cavities excited by oscillating radio frequency (RF) fields. Electrodynamic accelerators can be linear, with particles accelerating in a straight line, or circular, using magnetic fields to bend particles in a roughly circular orbit.

=== Magnetic induction accelerators ===
Magnetic induction accelerators accelerate particles by induction from an increasing magnetic field, as if the particles were the secondary winding in a transformer. The increasing magnetic field creates a circulating electric field which can be configured to accelerate the particles. Induction accelerators can be either linear or circular.

==== Linear induction accelerators ====
Linear induction accelerators utilize ferrite-loaded, non-resonant induction cavities. Each cavity can be thought of as two large washer-shaped disks connected by an outer cylindrical tube. Between the disks is a ferrite toroid. A voltage pulse applied between the two disks causes an increasing magnetic field which inductively couples power into the charged particle beam.

The linear induction accelerator was invented by Christofilos in the 1960s. Linear induction accelerators are capable of accelerating very high beam currents (>1000 A) in a single short pulse. They have been used to generate X-rays for flash radiography (e.g. DARHT at LANL), and have been considered as particle injectors for magnetic confinement fusion and as drivers for free electron lasers.

==== Betatrons ====
The Betatron is a circular magnetic induction accelerator, invented by Donald Kerst in 1940 for accelerating electrons. The concept originates ultimately from Norwegian-German scientist Rolf Widerøe. These machines, like synchrotrons, use a donut-shaped ring magnet (see below) with a cyclically increasing B field, but accelerate the particles by induction from the increasing magnetic field, as if they were the secondary winding in a transformer, due to the changing magnetic flux through the orbit.

Achieving constant orbital radius while supplying the proper accelerating electric field requires that the magnetic flux linking the orbit be somewhat independent of the magnetic field on the orbit, bending the particles into a constant radius curve. These machines have in practice been limited by the large radiative losses suffered by the electrons moving at nearly the speed of light in a relatively small radius orbit.

=== Linear accelerators ===
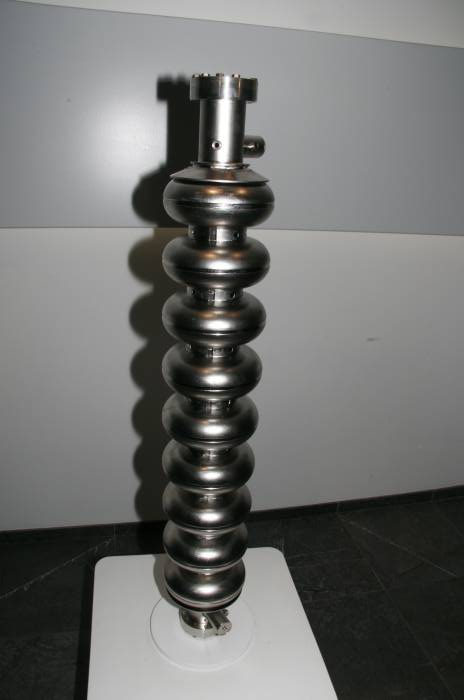
Modern superconducting radio frequency, multicell linear accelerator component.

In a linear particle accelerator (linac), particles are accelerated in a straight line with a target of interest at one end. They are often used to provide an initial low-energy kick to particles before they are injected into circular accelerators. The longest linac in the world is the Stanford Linear Accelerator, SLAC, which is 3 km (1.9 mi) long. SLAC was originally an electron–positron collider but is now a X-ray Free-electron laser.

Linear high-energy accelerators use a linear array of plates (or drift tubes) to which an alternating high-energy field is applied. As the particles approach a plate they are accelerated towards it by an opposite polarity charge applied to the plate. As they pass through a hole in the plate, the polarity is switched so that the plate now repels them and they are now accelerated by it towards the next plate. Normally a stream of "bunches" of particles are accelerated, so a carefully controlled AC voltage is applied to each plate to continuously repeat this process for each bunch.

As the particles approach the speed of light the switching rate of the electric fields becomes so high that they operate at radio frequencies, and so microwave cavities are used in higher energy machines instead of simple plates.

Linear accelerators are also widely used in medicine, for radiotherapy and radiosurgery. Medical grade linacs accelerate electrons using a klystron and a complex bending magnet arrangement which produces a beam of energy 6–30 MeV. The electrons can be used directly or they can be collided with a target to produce a beam of X-rays. The reliability, flexibility and accuracy of the radiation beam produced has largely supplanted the older use of cobalt-60 therapy as a treatment tool.

=== Circular or cyclic RF accelerators ===
In the circular accelerator, particles move in a circle until they reach enough energy. The particle track is typically bent into a circle using electromagnets. The advantage of circular accelerators over linear accelerators (linacs) is that the ring topology allows continuous acceleration, as the particle can transit indefinitely. Another advantage is that a circular accelerator is smaller than a linear accelerator of comparable power (i.e. a linac would have to be extremely long to have the equivalent power of a circular accelerator).

Depending on the energy and the particle being accelerated, circular accelerators suffer a disadvantage in that the particles emit synchrotron radiation. When any charged particle is accelerated, it emits electromagnetic radiation and secondary emissions. As a particle traveling in a circle is always accelerating towards the center of the circle, it continuously radiates towards the tangent of the circle. This radiation is called synchrotron light and depends highly on the mass of the accelerating particle. For this reason, many high energy electron accelerators are linacs. Certain accelerators (synchrotrons) are however built specially for producing synchrotron light (X-rays).

Since the special theory of relativity requires that matter always travels slower than the speed of light in vacuum, in high-energy accelerators, as the energy increases the particle speed approaches the speed of light as a limit, but never attains it. Therefore, particle physicists do not generally think in terms of speed, but rather in terms of a particle's energy or momentum, usually measured in electron volts (eV). An important principle for circular accelerators, and particle beams in general, is that the curvature of the particle trajectory is proportional to the particle charge and to the magnetic field, but inversely proportional to the (typically relativistic) momentum.

==== Cyclotrons ====
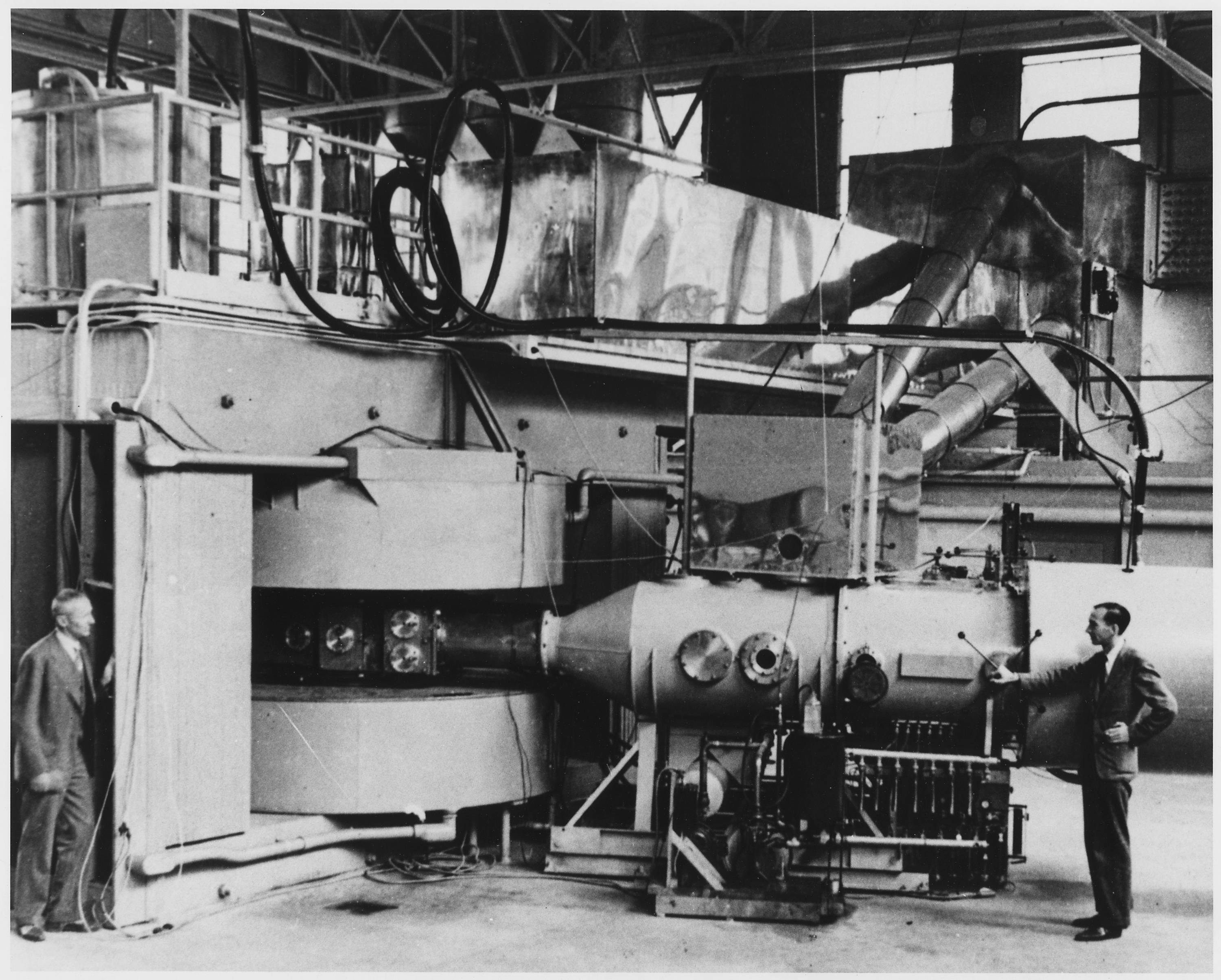
Lawrence's 60 inch cyclotron, with magnet poles 60 inches (5 feet, 1.5 meters) in diameter, at the University of California Lawrence Radiation Laboratory, Berkeley, in August, 1939, the most powerful accelerator in the world at the time. Glenn T. Seaborg and Edwin McMillan (right) used it to discover plutonium, neptunium and many other transuranic elements and isotopes, for which they received the 1951 Nobel Prize in chemistry.

The earliest operational circular accelerators were cyclotrons, invented in 1929 by Ernest Lawrence at the University of California, Berkeley. Cyclotrons have a single pair of hollow D-shaped plates to accelerate the particles and a single large dipole magnet to bend their path into a circular orbit. It is a characteristic property of charged particles in a uniform and constant magnetic field B that they orbit with a constant period, at a frequency called the cyclotron frequency, so long as their speed is small compared to the speed of light c. This means that the accelerating D's of a cyclotron can be driven at a constant frequency by a RF accelerating power source, as the beam spirals outwards continuously. The particles are injected in the center of the magnet and are extracted at the outer edge at their maximum energy.

Cyclotrons reach an energy limit because of relativistic effects whereby the particles effectively become more massive, so that their cyclotron frequency drops out of sync with the accelerating RF. Therefore, simple cyclotrons can accelerate protons only to an energy of around 15 million electron volts (15 MeV, corresponding to a speed of roughly 10% of c), because the protons get out of phase with the driving electric field. If accelerated further, the beam would continue to spiral outward to a larger radius but the particles would no longer gain enough speed to complete the larger circle in step with the accelerating RF. To accommodate relativistic effects the magnetic field needs to be increased to higher radii as is done in isochronous cyclotrons. An example of an isochronous cyclotron is the PSI Ring cyclotron in Switzerland, which provides protons at the energy of 590 MeV which corresponds to roughly 80% of the speed of light. The advantage of such a cyclotron is the maximum achievable extracted proton current which is currently 2.2 mA. The energy and current correspond to 1.3 MW beam power which is the highest of any accelerator currently existing.

==== Synchrocyclotrons and isochronous cyclotrons ====
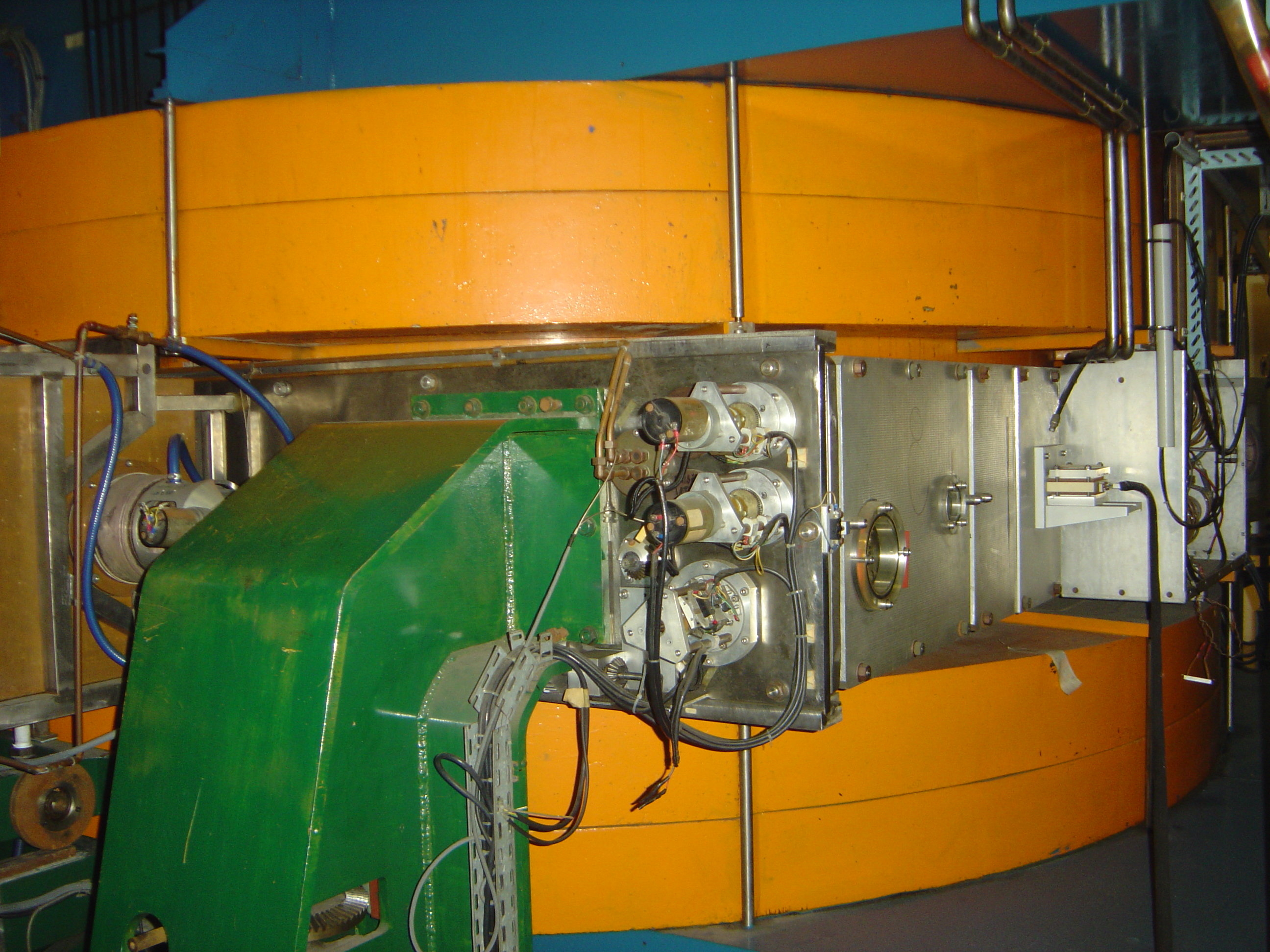
A magnet in the synchrocyclotron at the Orsay proton therapy center

A classic cyclotron can be modified to increase its energy limit. The historically first approach was the synchrocyclotron, which accelerates the particles in bunches. It uses a constant magnetic field $B$, but reduces the accelerating field's frequency so as to keep the particles in step as they spiral outward, matching their mass-dependent cyclotron resonance frequency. This approach suffers from low average beam intensity due to the bunching, and again from the need for a huge magnet of large radius and constant field over the larger orbit demanded by high energy.

The second approach to the problem of accelerating relativistic particles is the isochronous cyclotron. In such a structure, the accelerating field's frequency (and the cyclotron resonance frequency) is kept constant for all energies by shaping the magnet poles so to increase magnetic field with radius. Thus, all particles get accelerated in isochronous time intervals. Higher energy particles travel a shorter distance in each orbit than they would in a classical cyclotron, thus remaining in phase with the accelerating field. The advantage of the isochronous cyclotron is that it can deliver continuous beams of higher average intensity, which is useful for some applications. The main disadvantages are the size and cost of the large magnet needed, and the difficulty in achieving the high magnetic field values required at the outer edge of the structure.

Synchrocyclotrons have not been built since the isochronous cyclotron was developed.

==== Synchrotrons ====
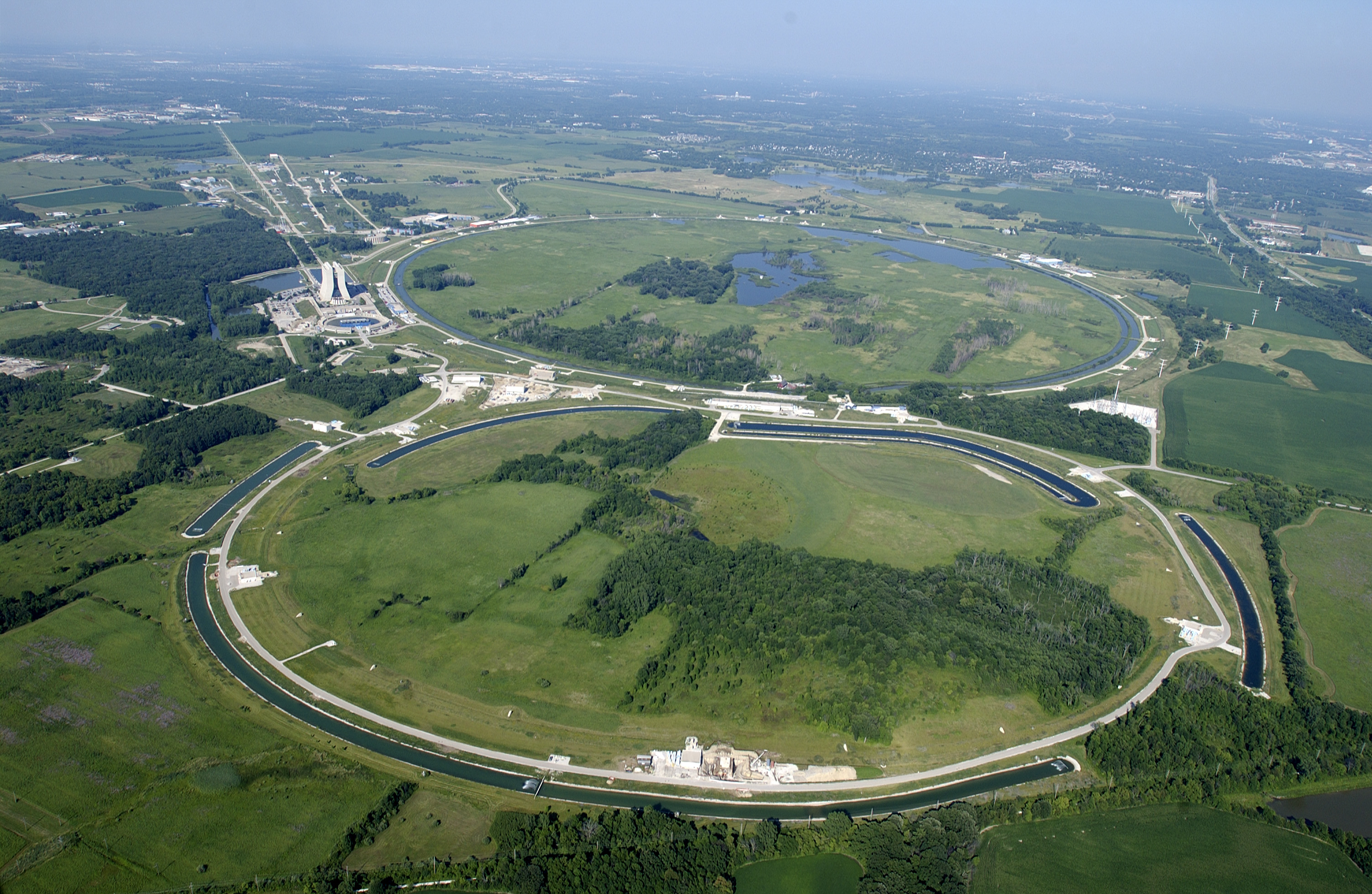
Aerial photo of the Tevatron (background ring) and Main Injector (foreground ring which is not actually circular) rings at Fermilab. The Tevatron ring also contains Main Ring and a section of it is still used for downstream experiments. The Main Injector below (about half the diameter of the Tevatron) is for preliminary acceleration, beam cooling and storage, etc.

To reach still higher energies, with relativistic mass approaching or exceeding the rest mass of the particles (for protons, billions of electron volts or GeV), it is necessary to use a synchrotron. This is an accelerator in which the particles are accelerated in a ring of constant radius. An immediate advantage over cyclotrons is that the magnetic field need only be present over the actual region of the particle orbits, which is much narrower than that of the ring. (The largest cyclotron built in the US had a 184-inch-diameter (4.7 m) magnet pole, whereas the diameter of synchrotrons such as the LEP and LHC is nearly 10 km. The aperture of the two beams of the LHC is of the order of a centimeter.) The LHC contains 16 RF cavities, 1232 superconducting dipole magnets for beam steering, and 24 quadrupoles for beam focusing. Even at this size, the LHC is limited by its ability to steer the particles without them going adrift. This limit is theorized to occur at 14 TeV.

However, since the particle momentum increases during acceleration, it is necessary to turn up the magnetic field B in proportion to maintain constant curvature of the orbit. In consequence, synchrotrons cannot accelerate particles continuously, as cyclotrons can, but must operate cyclically, supplying particles in bunches, which are delivered to a target or an external beam in beam "spills" typically every few seconds.

Since high energy synchrotrons do most of their work on particles that are already traveling at nearly the speed of light c, the time to complete one orbit of the ring is nearly constant, as is the frequency of the RF cavity resonators used to drive the acceleration.

In modern synchrotrons, the beam aperture is small and the magnetic field does not cover the entire area of the particle orbit as it does for a cyclotron, so several necessary functions can be separated. Instead of one huge magnet, one has a line of hundreds of bending magnets, enclosing (or enclosed by) vacuum connecting pipes. The design of synchrotrons was revolutionized in the early 1950s with the discovery of the strong focusing concept. The focusing of the beam is handled independently by specialized quadrupole magnets, while the acceleration itself is accomplished in separate RF sections, rather similar to short linear accelerators. Also, there is no necessity that cyclic machines be circular, but rather the beam pipe may have straight sections between magnets where beams may collide, be cooled, etc. This has developed into an entire separate subject, called "beam physics" or "beam optics".

More complex modern synchrotrons such as the Tevatron, LEP, and LHC may deliver the particle bunches into storage rings of magnets with a constant magnetic field, where they can continue to orbit for long periods for experimentation or further acceleration. The highest-energy machines such as the Tevatron and LHC are actually accelerator complexes, with a cascade of specialized elements in series, including linear accelerators for initial beam creation, one or more low energy synchrotrons to reach intermediate energy, storage rings where beams can be accumulated or "cooled" (reducing the magnet aperture required and permitting tighter focusing; see beam cooling), and a last large ring for final acceleration and experimentation.

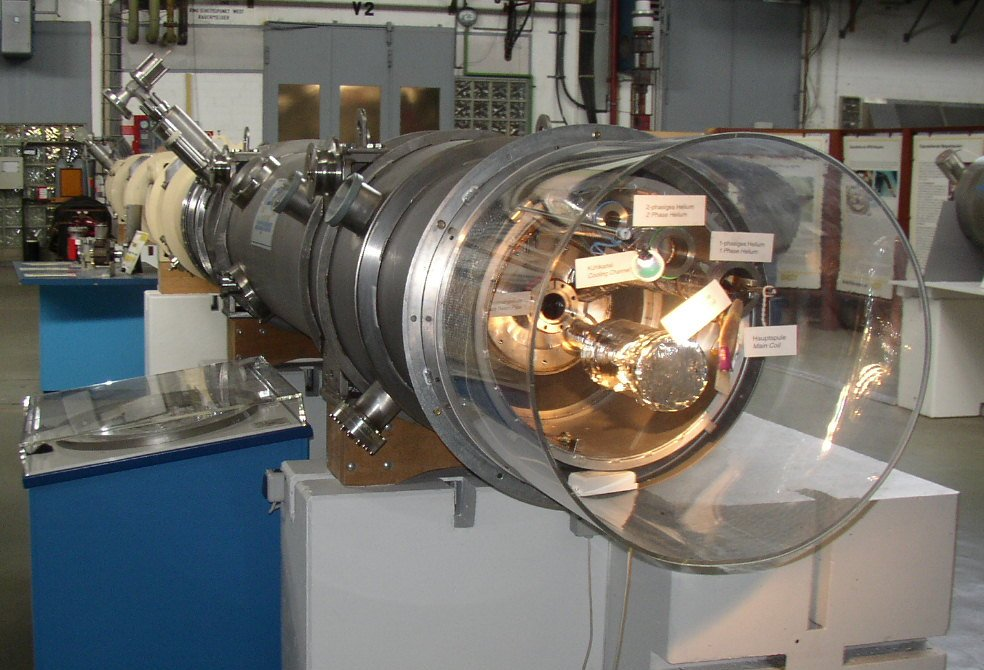
Segment of an electron synchrotron at DESY

===== Electron synchrotrons =====
Circular electron accelerators fell out of favor for particle physics around the time that SLAC's linear particle accelerator was constructed, because their synchrotron losses were considered economically prohibitive and because their beam intensity was lower than for the unpulsed linear machines. The Cornell Electron Synchrotron, built at low cost in the late 1970s, was the first in a series of high-energy circular electron accelerators built for fundamental particle physics, the last being LEP, built at CERN, which was used from 1989 until 2000.

A large number of electron synchrotrons have been built in the past two decades, as part of synchrotron light sources that emit ultraviolet light and X rays; see below.

==== Synchrotron radiation sources ====
Some circular accelerators have been built to deliberately generate radiation (called synchrotron light) as X-rays also called synchrotron radiation, for example the Diamond Light Source which has been built at the Rutherford Appleton Laboratory in England or the Advanced Photon Source at Argonne National Laboratory in Illinois, USA. High-energy X-rays are useful for X-ray spectroscopy of proteins or X-ray absorption fine structure (XAFS), for example.

Synchrotron radiation is more powerfully emitted by lighter particles, so these accelerators are invariably electron accelerators. Synchrotron radiation allows for better imaging as researched and developed at SLAC's SPEAR.

==== Fixed-field alternating gradient accelerators ====
Fixed-Field Alternating Gradient accelerators (FFA)s, in which a magnetic field which is fixed in time, but with a radial variation to achieve strong focusing, allows the beam to be accelerated with a high repetition rate but in a much smaller radial spread than in the cyclotron case. Isochronous FFAs, like isochronous cyclotrons, achieve continuous beam operation, but without the need for a huge dipole bending magnet covering the entire radius of the orbits. Some new developments in FFAs are covered in.

==== Rhodotron ====
A diagram of a Rhodotron. The electron beam is in red. E is the electron gun, L is an electron lens, C is the radiofrequency cavity, and M is a bending magnet.

A Rhodotron is an industrial electron accelerator first proposed in 1987 by J. Pottier of the French Atomic Energy Agency (CEA), manufactured by Belgian company Ion Beam Applications. It accelerates electrons by recirculating them across the diameter of a cylinder-shaped radiofrequency cavity. A Rhodotron has an electron gun, which emits an electron beam that is attracted to a pillar in the center of the cavity. The pillar has holes the electrons can pass through. The electron beam passes through the pillar via one of these holes and then travels through a hole in the wall of the cavity, and meets a bending magnet, the beam is then bent and sent back into the cavity, to another hole in the pillar, the electrons then again go across the pillar and pass through another part of the wall of the cavity and into another bending magnet, and so on, gradually increasing the energy of the beam until it is allowed to exit the cavity for use. The cylinder and pillar may be lined with copper on the inside.

==== History ====
Ernest Lawrence's first cyclotron was a mere 4 inches (100 mm) in diameter. Later, in 1939, he built a machine with a 60-inch diameter pole face, and planned one with a 184-inch diameter in 1942, which was, however, taken over for World War II-related work connected with uranium isotope separation; after the war it continued in service for research and medicine over many years.

The first large proton synchrotron was the Cosmotron at Brookhaven National Laboratory, which accelerated protons to about 3 GeV (1953–1968). The Bevatron at Berkeley, completed in 1954, was specifically designed to accelerate protons to enough energy to create antiprotons, and verify the particle–antiparticle symmetry of nature, then only theorized. The Alternating Gradient Synchrotron (AGS) at Brookhaven (1960–) was the first large synchrotron with alternating gradient, "strong focusing" magnets, which greatly reduced the required aperture of the beam, and correspondingly the size and cost of the bending magnets. The Proton Synchrotron, built at CERN (1959–), was the first major European particle accelerator and generally similar to the AGS.

The Stanford Linear Accelerator, SLAC, became operational in 1966, accelerating electrons to 30 GeV in a 3 km long waveguide, buried in a tunnel and powered by hundreds of large klystrons. It is still the largest linear accelerator in existence, and has been upgraded with the addition of storage rings and an electron-positron collider facility. It is also an X-ray and UV synchrotron photon source.

The Fermilab Tevatron has a ring with a beam path of 4 miles (6.4 km). It has received several upgrades, and has functioned as a proton-antiproton collider until it was shut down due to budget cuts on September 30, 2011. The largest circular accelerator ever built was the LEP synchrotron at CERN with a circumference 26.6 kilometers, which was an electron/positron collider. It achieved an energy of 209 GeV before it was dismantled in 2000 so that the tunnel could be used for the Large Hadron Collider (LHC). The LHC is a proton collider, and currently the world's largest and highest-energy accelerator, achieving 6.5 TeV energy per beam (13 TeV in total).

The aborted Superconducting Super Collider (SSC) in Texas would have had a circumference of 87 km. Construction was started in 1991, but abandoned in 1993. Very large circular accelerators are invariably built in tunnels a few metres wide to minimize the disruption and cost of building such a structure on the surface, and to provide shielding against intense secondary radiations that occur, which are extremely penetrating at high energies.

Current accelerators such as the Spallation Neutron Source, incorporate superconducting cryomodules. The Relativistic Heavy Ion Collider, and Large Hadron Collider also make use of superconducting magnets and RF cavity resonators to accelerate particles.

== Targets ==
The output of a particle accelerator can generally be directed towards multiple lines of experiments, one at a given time, by means of a deviating electromagnet. This makes it possible to operate multiple experiments without needing to move things around or shutting down the entire accelerator beam. Except for synchrotron radiation sources, the purpose of an accelerator is to generate high-energy particles for interaction with matter.

This is usually a fixed target, such as the phosphor coating on the back of the screen in the case of a television tube; a piece of uranium in an accelerator designed as a neutron source; or a tungsten target for an X-ray generator. In a linac, the target is simply fitted to the end of the accelerator. The particle track in a cyclotron is a spiral outwards from the centre of the circular machine, so the accelerated particles emerge from a fixed point as for a linear accelerator.

For synchrotrons, the situation is more complex. Particles are accelerated to the desired energy. Then, a fast acting dipole magnet is used to switch the particles out of the circular synchrotron tube and towards the target.

A variation commonly used for particle physics research is a collider, also called a storage ring collider. Two circular synchrotrons are built in close proximity – usually on top of each other and using the same magnets (which are then of more complicated design to accommodate both beam tubes). Bunches of particles travel in opposite directions around the two accelerators and collide at intersections between them. This can increase the energy enormously; whereas in a fixed-target experiment the energy available to produce new particles is proportional to the square root of the beam energy, in a collider the available energy is linear.

== Detectors ==
The detectors gather clues about the particles including their speed and charge. Using these, the scientists can actually work on the particle. The process of detection is very complex it requires strong electromagnets and accelerators to generate enough usable information.

== Higher energies ==
At present the highest energy accelerators are all circular colliders, but both hadron accelerators and electron accelerators are running into limits. Higher energy hadron and ion cyclic accelerators will require accelerator tunnels of larger physical size due to the increased beam rigidity.

For cyclic electron accelerators, a limit on practical bend radius is placed by synchrotron radiation losses and the next generation will probably be linear accelerators 10 times the current length. An example of such a next generation electron accelerator is the proposed 40 km long International Linear Collider.

It is believed that plasma wakefield acceleration in the form of electron-beam "afterburners" and standalone laser pulsers might be able to provide dramatic increases in efficiency over RF accelerators within two to three decades. In plasma wakefield accelerators, the beam cavity is filled with a plasma (rather than vacuum). A short pulse of electrons or laser light either constitutes or immediately precedes the particles that are being accelerated. The pulse disrupts the plasma, causing the charged particles in the plasma to integrate into and move toward the rear of the bunch of particles that are being accelerated. This process transfers energy to the particle bunch, accelerating it further, and continues as long as the pulse is coherent.

Energy gradients as steep as 200 GeV/m have been achieved over millimeter-scale distances using laser pulsers and gradients approaching 1 GeV/m are being produced on the multi-centimeter-scale with electron-beam systems, in contrast to a limit of about 0.1 GeV/m for radio-frequency acceleration alone. Existing electron accelerators such as SLAC could use electron-beam afterburners to greatly increase the energy of their particle beams, at the cost of beam intensity. Electron systems in general can provide tightly collimated, reliable beams; laser systems may offer more power and compactness. Thus, plasma wakefield accelerators could be used – if technical issues can be resolved – to both increase the maximum energy of the largest accelerators and to bring high energies into university laboratories and medical centres.

Higher than 0.25 GeV/m gradients have been achieved by a dielectric laser accelerator, which may present another viable approach to building compact high-energy accelerators. Using femtosecond duration laser pulses, an electron accelerating gradient 0.69 GeV/m was recorded for dielectric laser accelerators. Higher gradients of the order of 1 to 6 GeV/m are anticipated after further optimizations.

=== Advanced Accelerator Concepts ===
Advanced Accelerator Concepts encompasses methods of beam acceleration with gradients beyond state of the art in operational facilities. This includes diagnostics methods, timing technology, special needs for injectors, beam matching, beam dynamics and development of adequate simulations. Workshops dedicated to this subject are being held in the US (alternating locations) and in Europe, mostly on Isola d'Elba. The series of Advanced Accelerator Concepts Workshops, held in the US, started as an international series in 1982. The European Advanced Accelerator Concepts Workshop series started in 2019. Topics related to Advanced Accelerator Concepts:

- Laser Plasma Acceleration of electrons and positrons
- Laser and High-Gradient Structure-Based Acceleration
- Beam-Driven Acceleration
- Laser-Plasma Acceleration of Ions
- Beam Sources such as electron gun, Monitoring, and Control. See Accelerator physics
- Computer simulation for Accelerator Physics
- Laser technology for particle acceleration
- Electromagnetic radiation Generation
- Muon collider

According to the Inverse scattering problem, any mechanism by which a particle produces radiation (where kinetic energy of the particle is transferred to the electromagnetic field), can be inverted such that the same radiation mechanism leads to the acceleration of the particle (energy of the radiation field is transferred to kinetic energy of the particle). The opposite is also true, any acceleration mechanism can be inverted to deposit the energy of the particle into a decelerating field, like in a kinetic energy recovery system. This is the idea enabling an energy recovery linac. This principle, which is also behind the plasma or dielectric wakefield accelerrators, led to a few other interesting developments in advanced accelerator concepts:

- Cherenkov radiation led to inverse Cherenkov radiation accelerator.
- Free-electron laser led to the Inverse Free-electron laser accelerator.
- A laser can also be inverted to produce acceleration of electrons.

=== Black hole production and public safety concerns ===
In the future, the possibility of a black hole production at the highest energy accelerators may arise if certain predictions of superstring theory are accurate. This and other possibilities have led to public safety concerns that have been widely reported in connection with the European Organization for Nuclear Research's (CERN) Large Hadron Collider (LHC) in Geneva, Switzerland; near the French border, which began operation in 2008. The various possible dangerous scenarios have been assessed as presenting "no conceivable danger" in the latest risk assessment produced by the LHC Safety Assessment Group. If black holes are produced, it is theoretically predicted that such small black holes should evaporate extremely quickly via Bekenstein–Hawking radiation, but which is as yet experimentally unconfirmed. If colliders can produce black holes, cosmic rays (and particularly ultra-high-energy cosmic rays, UHECRs) must have been producing them for eons, but they have yet to harm anybody. It has been argued that to conserve energy and momentum, any black holes created in a collision between an UHECR and local matter would necessarily be produced moving at relativistic speed with respect to the Earth, and should escape into space, as their accretion and growth rate should be very slow, while black holes produced in colliders (with components of equal mass) would have some chance of having a velocity less than Earth escape velocity, 11.2 km per sec, and would be liable to capture and subsequent growth. Yet even on such scenarios the collisions of UHECRs with white dwarfs and neutron stars would lead to their rapid destruction, but these bodies are observed to be common astronomical objects. Thus if stable micro black holes should be produced, they must grow far too slowly to cause any noticeable macroscopic effects within the natural lifetime of the solar system.

== Accelerator operator ==
The use of advanced technologies such as superconductivity, cryogenics, and high powered radiofrequency amplifiers, as well as the presence of ionizing radiation, pose challenges for the safe operation of accelerator facilities. An accelerator operator controls the operation of a particle accelerator, adjusts operating parameters such as aspect ratio, current intensity, and position on target. They communicate with and assist accelerator maintenance personnel to ensure readiness of support systems, such as vacuum, magnets, magnetic and radiofrequency power supplies and controls, and cooling systems. Additionally, the accelerator operator maintains a record of accelerator related events.

== See also ==
- Accelerator physics
- Atom smasher (disambiguation)
- Compact Linear Collider
- Dielectric wall accelerator
- Future Circular Collider
- International Linear Collider
- KALI
- Linear particle accelerator
- List of accelerators in particle physics
- Momentum compaction
- Nuclear transmutation
- Rolf Widerøe
- Superconducting Super Collider
