= Hidden momentum =

Physics concept

In special relativity, hidden momentum or hidden mechanical momentum is the mechanical momentum (mass times velocity) that is unaccounted for by Newtonian mechanics. The concept of "hidden momentum" has been used in answering "paradoxes" in electromagnetism and other problems, including the Shockley–James paradox, the Mansuripur paradox, and the Aharonov–Casher effect. However, these paradoxes have resolution without introducing hidden momentum.

== Hidden Momentum ==
Several mechanisms for hidden momentum are proposed in Resource Letter EM-1: Electromagnetic Momentum. However, none of these mechanisms have rigorous derivations or are effective in replacing the electromagnetic momentum of charge-current distributions.. There is no evidence that Hidden Momentum actually exists.
