= Momentum =

Property of a mass in motion

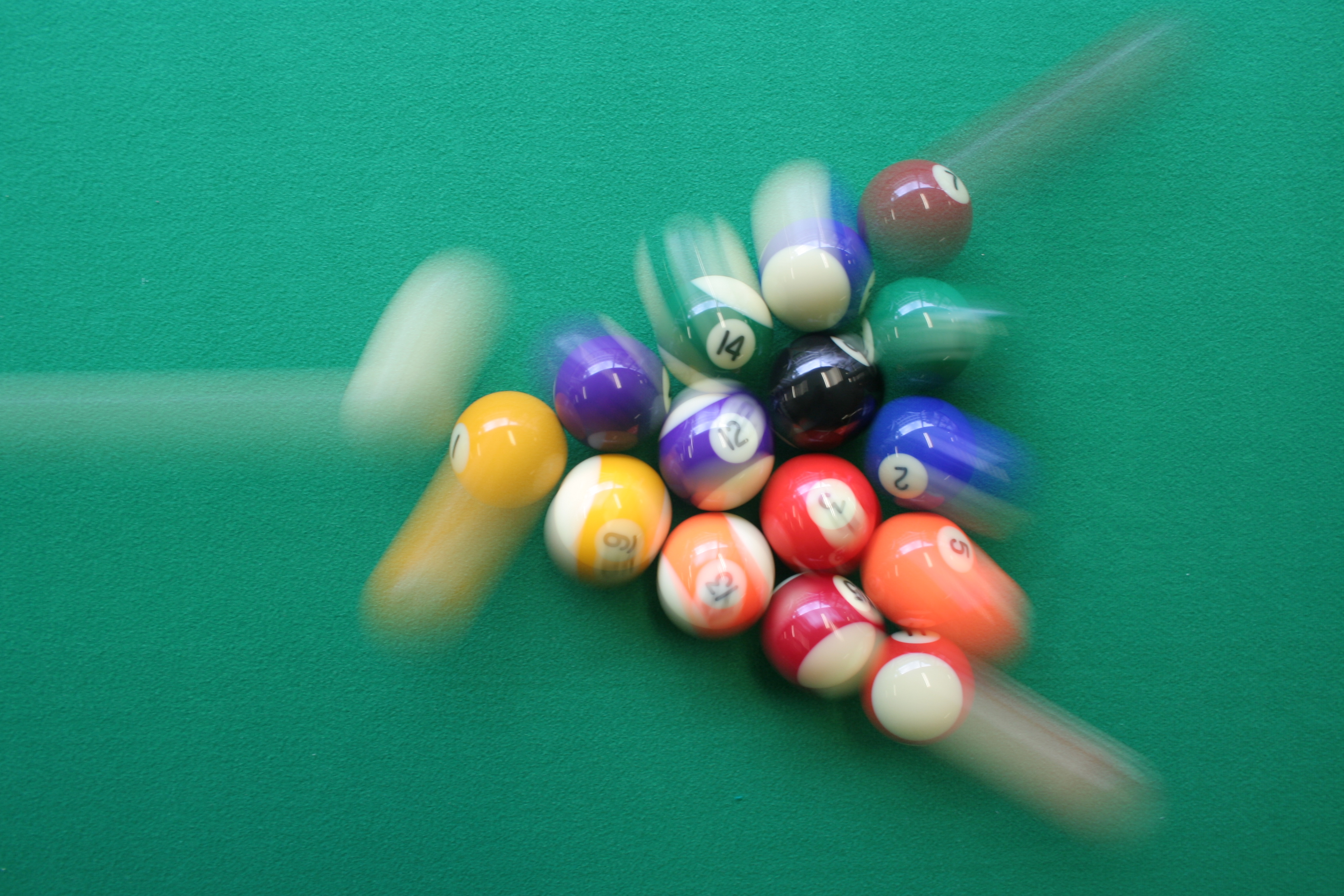
- Momentum of a pool cue ball is transferred to the racked balls after collision.
- Common symbols: p, p
- SI unit: kg⋅m⋅s^{−1}
- Other units: slug⋅ft/s
- Conserved?: Yes
- Dimension: $\mathsf{M} \mathsf{L} \mathsf{T}^{-1}$

In Newtonian mechanics, momentum (pl.: momenta or momentums; more specifically linear momentum or translational momentum) is the product of the mass and velocity of an object. It is a vector quantity, possessing a magnitude and a direction. If m is an object's mass and v is its velocity (also a vector quantity), then the object's momentum p (from Latin pellere "push, drive") is: $\mathbf{p} = m \mathbf{v}.$ In the International System of Units (SI), the unit of measurement of momentum is the kilogram metre per second (kg⋅m/s), which is dimensionally equivalent to the newton-second.

Newton's second law of motion states that the rate of change of a body's momentum is equal to the net force acting on it. Momentum depends on the frame of reference, but in any inertial frame of reference, it is a conserved quantity, meaning that if a closed system is not affected by external forces, its total momentum does not change. Momentum is also conserved in special relativity (with a modified formula) and, in a modified form, in electrodynamics, quantum mechanics, quantum field theory, and general relativity. It is an expression of one of the fundamental symmetries of space and time: translational symmetry.

Advanced formulations of classical mechanics, Lagrangian and Hamiltonian mechanics, allow one to choose coordinate systems that incorporate symmetries and constraints. In these systems the conserved quantity is generalized momentum, and in general this is different from the kinetic momentum defined above. The concept of generalized momentum is carried over into quantum mechanics, where it becomes an operator on a wave function. The momentum and position operators are related by the Heisenberg uncertainty principle.

In continuous systems such as electromagnetic fields, fluid dynamics and deformable bodies, a momentum density can be defined as momentum per volume (a volume-specific quantity) and is said to satisfy a conservation law. A continuum version of the conservation of momentum leads to equations such as the Navier–Stokes equations for fluids or the Cauchy momentum equation for deformable solids or fluids.

== Classical ==
Momentum is a vector quantity: it has both magnitude and direction. Since momentum has a direction, it can be used to predict the resulting direction and speed of motion of objects after they collide. Below, the basic properties of momentum are described in one dimension. The vector equations are almost identical to the scalar equations (see multiple dimensions).

=== Single particle ===
The momentum of a particle is conventionally represented by the letter p. It is the product of two quantities, the particle's mass (represented by the letter m) and its velocity (v):
$$p = m v.$$

The unit of momentum is the product of the units of mass and velocity. In SI units, if the mass is in kilograms and the velocity is in meters per second then the momentum is in kilogram meters per second (kg⋅m/s). In cgs units, if the mass is in grams and the velocity in centimeters per second, then the momentum is in gram centimeters per second (g⋅cm/s).

Being a vector, momentum has magnitude and direction. For example, a 1 kg model airplane, traveling due north at 1 m/s in straight and level flight, has a momentum of 1 kg⋅m/s due north measured with reference to the ground.

=== Many particles ===
The momentum of a system of particles is the vector sum of their momenta. If two particles have respective masses m_{1} and m_{2}, and velocities v_{1} and v_{2}, the total momentum is
$$\begin{align}
p &= p_1 + p_2 \\
&= m_1 v_1 + m_2 v_2.
\end{align}$$
The momenta of more than two particles can be added more generally with the following:
$$p = \sum_{i} m_i v_i.$$

A system of particles has a center of mass, a point determined by the weighted sum of their positions:
$$r_\text{cm} = \frac{m_1 r_1 + m_2 r_2 + \cdots}{m_1 + m_2 + \cdots} = \frac{\sum_{i}m_ir_i}{\sum_{i}m_i}.$$

If one or more of the particles is moving, the center of mass of the system will generally be moving as well (unless the system is in pure rotation around it). If the total mass of the particles is $m$, and the center of mass is moving at velocity v_{cm}, the momentum of the system is
$$p = mv_\text{cm}.$$

This is known as Euler's first law.

=== Relation to force ===
If the net force F applied to a particle is constant, and is applied for a time interval Δt, the momentum of the particle changes by an amount
$$\Delta p = F \Delta t.$$

In differential form, this is Newton's second law; the rate of change of the momentum of a particle is equal to the instantaneous force F acting on it,
$$F = \frac{\text{d}p}{\text{d}t}.$$

If the net force experienced by a particle changes as a function of time, F(t), the change in momentum (or impulse J) between times t_{1} and t_{2} is
$$\Delta p = J = \int_{t_1}^{t_2} F(t) \,\text{d}t.$$

Impulse is measured in the derived units of the newton second (1 N⋅s = 1 kg⋅m/s) or dyne second (1 dyne⋅s = 1 g⋅cm/s)

Under the assumption of constant mass m, it is equivalent to write
$$F = \frac{\text{d}(mv)}{\text{d}t} = m\frac{\text{d}v}{\text{d}t} = m a,$$
hence the net force is equal to the mass of the particle times its acceleration.

Example: A model airplane of mass 1 kg accelerates from rest to a velocity of 6 m/s due north in 2 s. The net force required to produce this acceleration is 3 newtons due north. The change in momentum is 6 kg⋅m/s due north. The rate of change of momentum is 3 (kg⋅m/s)/s due north which is numerically equivalent to 3 newtons.

=== Conservation ===
In a closed system (one that does not exchange any matter with its surroundings and is not acted on by external forces) the total momentum remains constant. This fact, known as the law of conservation of momentum, is implied by Newton's laws of motion. Suppose, for example, that two particles interact. As explained by the third law, the forces between them are equal in magnitude but opposite in direction. If the particles are numbered 1 and 2, the second law states that F_{1} = dp_{1}/dt and F_{2} = dp_{2}/dt. Therefore,
$$\frac{\text{d}p_1}{\text{d}t} = -\frac{\text{d}p_2}{\text{d}t},$$
with the negative sign indicating that the forces oppose. Equivalently,
$$\frac{\text{d}}{\text{d}t} (p_1 + p_2) = 0.$$

If the velocities of the particles are v_{A1} and v_{B1} before the interaction, and afterwards they are v_{A2} and v_{B2}, then
$$m_A v_{A1} + m_B v_{B1} = m_{A} v_{A2} + m_B v_{B2}.$$

This law holds no matter how complicated the force is between particles. Similarly, if there are several particles, the momentum exchanged between each pair of particles adds to zero, so the total change in momentum is zero. The conservation of the total momentum of a number of interacting particles can be expressed as
$$m_A v_A + m_B v_B + m_C v_C + \ldots = \text{constant}.$$

This conservation law applies to all interactions, including collisions (both elastic and inelastic) and separations caused by explosive forces. It can also be generalized to situations where Newton's laws do not hold, such as in relativistic situations and those involving electrodynamics.

=== Dependence on reference frame ===
Momentum is a measurable quantity, and the measurement depends on the frame of reference. For example, if an aircraft of mass 1,000 kg flies through the air at a speed of 50 m/s, its momentum is 50,000 kg · m/s, but if the aircraft flies into a headwind of 5 m/s, its speed relative to the Earth's surface is only 45 m/s and its momentum drops to 45,000 kg · m/s. Both calculations are equally correct. In both frames of reference, any change in momentum will be found to be consistent with the relevant laws of physics.

Suppose x is a position in an inertial frame of reference. From the point of view of another frame of reference, moving at a constant speed u relative to the other, the position (represented by a primed coordinate) changes with time as
$$x' = x - ut.$$
This is called a Galilean transformation.

If a particle is moving at speed dx/dt = v in the first frame of reference, in the second, it is moving at speed
$$v' = \frac{\text{d}x'}{\text{d}t} = v - u.$$

Since u does not change, the second reference frame is also an inertial frame and the accelerations are the same:
$$a' = \frac{\text{d}v'}{\text{d}t} = a.$$

Thus, momentum is conserved in both reference frames. Moreover, as long as the force has the same form, in both frames, Newton's second law is unchanged. Forces such as Newtonian gravity, which depend only on the scalar distance between objects, satisfy this criterion. This independence of reference frame is called Newtonian relativity or Galilean invariance.

A change of reference frame can often simplify calculations of motion. For example, in a collision of two particles, a reference frame can be chosen where one particle begins at rest. Another commonly used reference frame is the center of mass frame – one that is moving with the center of mass. In this frame, the total momentum is zero.

=== Application to collisions ===
If two particles, each of known momentum, collide and coalesce, the law of conservation of momentum can be used to determine the momentum of the coalesced body. If the outcome of the collision is that the two particles separate, the law is not sufficient to determine the momentum of each particle. If the momentum of one particle after the collision is known, the law can be used to determine the momentum of the other particle. Alternatively if the combined kinetic energy after the collision is known, the law can be used to determine the momentum of each particle after the collision. Kinetic energy is usually not conserved. If it is conserved, the collision is called an elastic collision; if not, it is an inelastic collision.

==== Elastic collisions ====
Elastic collision of equal masses

Elastic collision of unequal masses

An elastic collision is one in which no kinetic energy is transformed into heat or some other form of energy. Perfectly elastic collisions can occur when the objects do not touch each other, as for example in atomic or nuclear scattering where electric repulsion keeps the objects apart. A slingshot maneuver of a satellite around a planet can also be viewed as a perfectly elastic collision. A collision between two pool balls is a good example of an almost totally elastic collision, due to their high rigidity, but when bodies come in contact there is always some dissipation.

A head-on elastic collision between two bodies can be represented by velocities in one dimension, along a line passing through the bodies. If the velocities are v_{A1} and v_{B1} before the collision and v_{A2} and v_{B2} after, the equations expressing conservation of momentum and kinetic energy are
$$\begin{align}
m_{A} v_{A1} + m_{B} v_{B1} &= m_{A} v_{A2} + m_{B} v_{B2}, \\
\tfrac{1}{2} m_{A} v_{A1}^2 + \tfrac{1}{2} m_{B} v_{B1}^2 &= \tfrac{1}{2} m_{A} v_{A2}^2 + \tfrac{1}{2} m_{B} v_{B2}^2.
\end{align}$$

A change of reference frame can simplify analysis of a collision. For example, suppose there are two bodies of equal mass m, one stationary and one approaching the other at a speed v (as in the figure). The center of mass is moving at speed v/2 and both bodies are moving towards it at speed v/2. Because of the symmetry, after the collision both must be moving away from the center of mass at the same speed. Adding the speed of the center of mass to both, we find that the body that was moving is now stopped and the other is moving away at speed v. The bodies have exchanged their velocities. Regardless of the velocities of the bodies, a switch to the center of mass frame leads us to the same conclusion. Therefore, the final velocities are given by
$$\begin{align}
v_{A2} &= v_{B1}, \\
v_{B2} &= v_{A1}.
\end{align}$$

In general, when the initial velocities are known, the final velocities are given by
$$\begin{align}
v_{A2} &= \left( \frac{m_{A} - m_{B}}{m_{A} + m_{B}} \right) v_{A1} + \left( \frac{2 m_{B}}{m_{A} + m_{B}} \right) v_{B1}, \\
v_{B2} &= \left( \frac{m_{B} - m_{A}}{m_{A} + m_{B}} \right) v_{B1} + \left( \frac{2 m_{A}}{m_{A} + m_{B}} \right) v_{A1}.
\end{align}$$

If one body has much greater mass than the other, its velocity will be little affected by a collision while the other body will experience a large change.

==== Inelastic collisions ====
a perfectly inelastic collision between equal masses

In an inelastic collision, some of the kinetic energy of the colliding bodies is converted into other forms of energy (such as heat or sound). Examples include traffic collisions, in which the effect of loss of kinetic energy can be seen in the damage to the vehicles; electrons losing some of their energy to atoms (as in the Franck–Hertz experiment); and particle accelerators in which the kinetic energy is converted into mass in the form of new particles.

In a perfectly inelastic collision (such as a bug hitting a windshield), both bodies have the same motion afterwards. A head-on inelastic collision between two bodies can be represented by velocities in one dimension, along a line passing through the bodies. If the velocities are v_{A1} and v_{B1} before the collision then in a perfectly inelastic collision both bodies will be travelling with velocity v_{2} after the collision. The equation expressing conservation of momentum is
$$m_A v_{A1} + m_B v_{B1} = (m_A + m_B) v_2.$$

If one body is motionless to begin with (e.g. $v_{B1} = 0$), the equation for conservation of momentum is
$$m_A v_{A1} = (m_A + m_B) v_2,$$
so
$$v_2 = \frac{m_{A}}{m_{A}+m_{B}} v_{A1}.$$

In a different situation, if the frame of reference is moving at the final velocity such that $v_2 = 0$, the objects would be brought to rest by a perfectly inelastic collision and 100% of the kinetic energy is converted to other forms of energy. In this instance the initial velocities of the bodies would be non-zero, or the bodies would have to be massless.

One measure of the inelasticity of the collision is the coefficient of restitution C_{R}, defined as the ratio of relative velocity of separation to relative velocity of approach. In applying this measure to a ball bouncing from a solid surface, this can be easily measured using the following formula:
$$C_\text{R} = \sqrt{\frac{\text{bounce height}}{\text{drop height}}}.$$

The momentum and energy equations also apply to the motions of objects that begin together and then move apart. For example, an explosion is the result of a chain reaction that transforms potential energy stored in chemical, mechanical, or nuclear form into kinetic energy, acoustic energy, and electromagnetic radiation. Rockets also make use of conservation of momentum: propellant is thrust outward, gaining momentum, and an equal and opposite momentum is imparted to the rocket.

=== Multiple dimensions ===
Two-dimensional elastic collision. There is no motion perpendicular to the image, so only two components are needed to represent the velocities and momenta. The two blue vectors represent velocities after the collision and add vectorially to get the initial (red) velocity.

Real motion has both direction and velocity and must be represented by a vector. In a coordinate system with x, y, z axes, velocity has components v_{x} in the x-direction, v_{y} in the y-direction, v_{z} in the z-direction. The vector is represented by a boldface symbol:
$$\mathbf{v} = (v_x, v_y, v_z).$$

Similarly, the momentum is a vector quantity and is represented by a boldface symbol:
$$\mathbf{p} = (p_x, p_y, p_z).$$

The equations in the previous sections, work in vector form if the scalars p and v are replaced by vectors p and v. Each vector equation represents three scalar equations. For example,
$$\mathbf{p} = m \mathbf{v}$$
represents three equations
$$\begin{align}
p_x &= m v_x, \\
p_y &= m v_y, \\
p_z &= m v_z.
\end{align}$$

The kinetic energy equations are exceptions to the above replacement rule. The equations are still one-dimensional, but each scalar represents the magnitude of the vector, for example,
$$v^2 = v_x^2 + v_y^2 + v_z^2.$$

Each vector equation represents three scalar equations. Often coordinates can be chosen so that only two components are needed, as in the figure. Each component can be obtained separately and the results combined to produce a vector result.

A simple construction involving the center of mass frame can be used to show that if a stationary elastic sphere is struck by a moving sphere, the two will head off at right angles after the collision (as in the figure).

=== Objects of variable mass ===
The concept of momentum plays a fundamental role in explaining the behavior of variable-mass objects such as a rocket ejecting fuel or a star accreting gas. In analyzing such an object, one treats the object's mass as a function that varies with time: m(t). The momentum of the object at time t is therefore p(t) = m(t)v(t). One might then try to invoke Newton's second law of motion by saying that the external force F on the object is related to its momentum p(t) by F = dp/dt, but this is incorrect, as is the related expression found by applying the product rule to d(mv)/dt:
$$F = m(t) \frac{\text{d}v}{\text{d}t} + v(t) \frac{\text{d}m}{\text{d}t}. \text{(incorrect)}$$
This equation does not correctly describe the motion of variable-mass objects. The correct equation is
$$F = m(t) \frac{\text{d}v}{\text{d}t} - u \frac{\text{d}m}{\text{d}t},$$
where u is the velocity of the ejected/accreted mass as seen in the object's rest frame. This is distinct from v, which is the velocity of the object itself as seen in an inertial frame.

This equation is derived by keeping track of both the momentum of the object as well as the momentum of the ejected/accreted mass (dm). When considered together, the object and the mass (dm) constitute a closed system in which total momentum is conserved.
$$P(t + \text{d}t) = (m - \text{d}m)(v + \text{d}v) + (v - u)\,\text{d}m = mv + m\,\text{d}v - u\,\text{d}m = P(t) + m\,\text{d}v - u\,\text{d}m.$$

== Generalized ==
Newton's laws can be difficult to apply to many kinds of motion because the motion is limited by constraints. For example, a bead on an abacus is constrained to move along its wire and a pendulum bob is constrained to swing at a fixed distance from the pivot. Many such constraints can be incorporated by changing the normal Cartesian coordinates to a set of generalized coordinates that may be fewer in number. Refined mathematical methods have been developed for solving mechanics problems in generalized coordinates. They introduce a generalized momentum, also known as the canonical momentum or conjugate momentum, that extends the concepts of both linear momentum and angular momentum. To distinguish it from generalized momentum, the product of mass and velocity is also referred to as mechanical momentum, kinetic momentum or kinematic momentum. The two main methods are described below.

=== Lagrangian mechanics ===
In Lagrangian mechanics, a Lagrangian is defined as the difference between the kinetic energy T and the potential energy V:
$$\mathcal{L}  = T - V.$$

If the generalized coordinates are represented as a vector q = (q_{1}, q_{2}, ... , q_{N}) and time differentiation is represented by a dot over the variable, then the equations of motion (known as the Lagrange or Euler–Lagrange equations) are a set of N equations:
$$\frac{\text{d}}{\text{d}t} \left(\frac{\partial \mathcal{L} }{\partial\dot{q}_j}\right) - \frac{\partial \mathcal{L}}{\partial q_j} = 0.$$

If a coordinate q_{i} is not a Cartesian coordinate, the associated generalized momentum component p_{i} does not necessarily have the dimensions of linear momentum. Even if q_{i} is a Cartesian coordinate, p_{i} will not be the same as the mechanical momentum if the potential depends on velocity. Some sources represent the kinematic momentum by the symbol Π.

In this mathematical framework, a generalized momentum is associated with the generalized coordinates. Its components are defined as
$$p_j = \frac{\partial \mathcal{L} }{\partial \dot{q}_j}.$$

Each component p_{j} is said to be the conjugate momentum for the coordinate q_{j}.

Now if a given coordinate q_{i} does not appear in the Lagrangian (although its time derivative might appear), then p_{j} is constant. This is the generalization of the conservation of momentum.

Even if the generalized coordinates are just the ordinary spatial coordinates, the conjugate momenta are not necessarily the ordinary momentum coordinates. An example is found in the section on electromagnetism.

=== Hamiltonian mechanics ===
In Hamiltonian mechanics, the Lagrangian (a function of generalized coordinates and their derivatives) is replaced by a Hamiltonian that is a function of generalized coordinates and momentum. The Hamiltonian is defined as
$$\mathcal{H}\left(\mathbf{q},\mathbf{p},t\right) = \mathbf{p}\cdot\dot{\mathbf{q}} - \mathcal{L}\left(\mathbf{q},\dot{\mathbf{q}},t\right),$$
where the momentum is obtained by differentiating the Lagrangian as above. The Hamiltonian equations of motion are
$$\begin{align}
\dot{q}_i &= \frac{\partial\mathcal{H}}{\partial p_i}, \\
-\dot{p}_i &= \frac{\partial\mathcal{H}}{\partial q_i}, \\
-\frac{\partial \mathcal{L}}{\partial t} &= \frac{\text{d} \mathcal{H}}{\text{d}t}.
\end{align}$$

As in Lagrangian mechanics, if a generalized coordinate does not appear in the Hamiltonian, its conjugate momentum component is conserved.

=== Symmetry and conservation ===
Conservation of momentum is a mathematical consequence of the homogeneity (shift symmetry) of space (position in space is the canonical conjugate quantity to momentum). That is, conservation of momentum is a consequence of the fact that the laws of physics do not depend on position; this is a special case of Noether's theorem. For systems that do not have this symmetry, it may not be possible to define conservation of momentum. Examples where conservation of momentum does not apply include curved spacetimes in general relativity or time crystals in condensed matter physics.

== Momentum density ==
=== In deformable bodies and fluids ===
==== Conservation in a continuum ====
Motion of a material body

In fields such as fluid dynamics and solid mechanics, it is not feasible to follow the motion of individual atoms or molecules. Instead, the materials must be approximated by a continuum in which, at each point, there is a particle or fluid parcel that is assigned the average of the properties of atoms in a small region nearby. In particular, it has a density ρ and velocity v that depend on time t and position r. The momentum per unit volume is ρv.

Consider a column of water in hydrostatic equilibrium. All the forces on the water are in balance and the water is motionless. On any given drop of water, two forces are balanced. The first is gravity, which acts directly on each atom and molecule inside. The gravitational force per unit volume is ρg, where g is the gravitational acceleration. The second force is the sum of all the forces exerted on its surface by the surrounding water. The force from below is greater than the force from above by just the amount needed to balance gravity. The normal force per unit area is the pressure p. The average force per unit volume inside the droplet is the gradient of the pressure, so the force balance equation is
$$-\nabla p + \rho \mathbf{g} = 0.$$

If the forces are not balanced, the droplet accelerates. This acceleration is not simply the partial derivative ∂v/∂t because the fluid in a given volume changes with time. Instead, the material derivative is needed:
$$\frac{D}{Dt} \equiv \frac{\partial}{\partial t}  + \mathbf{v} \cdot \boldsymbol{\nabla}.$$

Applied to any physical quantity, the material derivative includes the rate of change at a point and the changes due to advection as fluid is carried past the point. Per unit volume, the rate of change in momentum is equal to ρDv/Dt. This is equal to the net force on the droplet.

Forces that can change the momentum of a droplet include the gradient of the pressure and gravity, as above. In addition, surface forces can deform the droplet. In the simplest case, a shear stress τ, exerted by a force parallel to the surface of the droplet, is proportional to the rate of deformation or strain rate. Such a shear stress occurs if the fluid has a velocity gradient because the fluid is moving faster on one side than another. If the speed in the x direction varies with z, the tangential force in direction x per unit area normal to the z direction is
$$\sigma_{zx} = -\mu\frac{\partial v_x}{\partial z},$$

where μ is the viscosity. This is also a flux, or flow per unit area, of x-momentum through the surface.

Including the effect of viscosity, the momentum balance equations for the incompressible flow of a Newtonian fluid are
$$\rho \frac{D \mathbf{v}}{D t} = -\boldsymbol{\nabla} p + \mu\nabla^2 \mathbf{v} + \rho\mathbf{g}.$$

These are known as the Navier–Stokes equations.

The momentum balance equations can be extended to more general materials, including solids. For each surface with normal in direction i and force in direction j, there is a stress component σ_{ij}. The nine components make up the Cauchy stress tensor σ, which includes both pressure and shear. The local conservation of momentum is expressed by the Cauchy momentum equation:
$$\rho \frac{D \mathbf{v}}{D t} = \boldsymbol{\nabla} \cdot \boldsymbol{\sigma} + \mathbf{f},$$
where f is the body force.

The Cauchy momentum equation is broadly applicable to deformations of solids and liquids. The relationship between the stresses and the strain rate depends on the properties of the material (see Types of viscosity).

==== Acoustic waves ====
A disturbance in a medium gives rise to oscillations, or waves, that propagate away from their source. In a fluid, small changes in pressure p can often be described by the acoustic wave equation:
$$\frac{\partial^2 p}{\partial t^2} = c^2 \nabla^2 p,$$
where c is the speed of sound. In a solid, similar equations can be obtained for propagation of pressure (P-waves) and shear (S-waves).

The flux, or transport per unit area, of a momentum component ρv_{j} by a velocity v_{i} is equal to ρv_{j}v_{j}. In the linear approximation that leads to the above acoustic equation, the time average of this flux is zero. However, nonlinear effects can give rise to a nonzero average. It is possible for momentum flux to occur even though the wave itself does not have a mean momentum.

=== In electromagnetics ===
==== Particle in a field ====
In Maxwell's equations, the forces between particles are mediated by electric and magnetic fields. The electromagnetic force (Lorentz force) on a particle with charge q due to a combination of electric field E and magnetic field B is
$$\mathbf{F} = q(\mathbf{E} + \mathbf{v} \times \mathbf{B}).$$
(in SI units). It has an electric potential φ(r, t) and magnetic vector potential A(r, t). In the non-relativistic regime, its generalized momentum is
$$\mathbf{P} = m\mathbf{\mathbf{v}} + q\mathbf{A},$$
while in relativistic mechanics this becomes
$$\mathbf{P} = \gamma m\mathbf{\mathbf{v}} + q\mathbf{A}.$$

The quantity V = qA is sometimes called the potential momentum. It is the momentum due to the interaction of the particle with the electromagnetic fields. The name is an analogy with the potential energy U = qφ, which is the energy due to the interaction of the particle with the electromagnetic fields. These quantities form a four-vector, so the analogy is consistent; besides, the concept of potential momentum is important in explaining the so-called hidden momentum of the electromagnetic fields.

==== Conservation ====
In Newtonian mechanics, the law of conservation of momentum can be derived from the law of action and reaction, which states that every force has a reciprocating equal and opposite force. Under some circumstances, moving charged particles can exert forces on each other in non-opposite directions. Nevertheless, the combined momentum of the particles and the electromagnetic field is conserved.

===== Vacuum =====
The Lorentz force imparts a momentum to the particle, so by Newton's second law the particle must impart a momentum to the electromagnetic fields.

In a vacuum, the momentum per unit volume is
$$\mathbf{g} = \frac{1}{\mu_0 c^2} \mathbf{E} \times \mathbf{B},$$

where μ_{0} is the vacuum permeability and c is the speed of light. The momentum density is proportional to the Poynting vector S which gives the directional rate of energy transfer per unit area:
$$\mathbf{g} = \frac{\mathbf{S}}{c^2}.$$

If momentum is to be conserved over the volume V over a region Q, changes in the momentum of matter through the Lorentz force must be balanced by changes in the momentum of the electromagnetic field and outflow of momentum. If P_{mech} is the momentum of all the particles in Q, and the particles are treated as a continuum, then Newton's second law gives
$$\frac{\text{d}\mathbf{P}_\text{mech}}{\text{d}t} = \iiint\limits_{Q} \left(\rho\mathbf{E} + \mathbf{J} \times \mathbf{B}\right) \,\text{d}V.$$

The electromagnetic momentum is
$$\mathbf{P}_\text{field} = \frac{1}{\mu_0c^2} \iiint\limits_{Q} \mathbf{E} \times \mathbf{B}\,dV,$$
and the equation for conservation of each component i of the momentum is
$$\frac{\text{d}}{\text{d}t}\left(\mathbf{P}_\text{mech} + \mathbf{P}_\text{field} \right)_i = \iint\limits_{\sigma} \left(\sum\limits_{j} T_{ij} n_j\right) \,\text{d}\Sigma.$$

The term on the right is an integral over the surface area Σ of the surface σ representing momentum flow into and out of the volume, and n_{j} is a component of the surface normal of S. The quantity T_{ij} is called the Maxwell stress tensor, defined as
$$T_{i j} \equiv \epsilon_0 \left(E_i E_j - \frac{1}{2} \delta_{ij} E^2\right) + \frac{1}{\mu_0} \left(B_i B_j - \frac{1}{2} \delta_{ij} B^2\right).$$

===== Media =====
The above results are for the microscopic Maxwell equations, applicable to electromagnetic forces in a vacuum (or on a very small scale in media). It is more difficult to define momentum density in media because the division into electromagnetic and mechanical is arbitrary. The definition of electromagnetic momentum density is modified to
$$\mathbf{g} = \frac{1}{c^2} \mathbf{E} \times \mathbf{H} = \frac{\mathbf{S}}{c^2},$$
where the H-field H is related to the B-field and the magnetization M by
$$\mathbf{B} = \mu_0 (\mathbf{H} + \mathbf{M}).$$

The electromagnetic stress tensor depends on the properties of the media.

== Non-classical ==
=== Quantum mechanical ===
In quantum mechanics, momentum is defined as a self-adjoint operator on the wave function. The Heisenberg uncertainty principle defines limits on how accurately the momentum and position of a single observable system can be known at once. In quantum mechanics, position and momentum are conjugate variables.

For a single particle described in the position basis the momentum operator can be written as
$$\mathbf{p} = \frac{\hbar}{i} \nabla = -i\hbar\nabla,$$
where ∇ is the gradient operator, ħ is the reduced Planck constant, and i is the imaginary unit. This is a commonly encountered form of the momentum operator, though the momentum operator in other bases can take other forms. For example, in momentum space the momentum operator is represented by the eigenvalue equation
$$\mathbf{p}\psi(p) = p\psi(p),$$
where the operator p acting on a wave eigenfunction ψ(p) yields that wave function multiplied by the eigenvalue p, in an analogous fashion to the way that the position operator acting on a wave function ψ(x) yields that wave function multiplied by the eigenvalue x.

For both massive and massless objects, relativistic momentum is related to the phase constant β by
$$p = \hbar \beta.$$

Electromagnetic radiation (including visible light, ultraviolet light, and radio waves) is carried by photons. Even though photons (the particle aspect of light) have no mass, they still carry momentum. This leads to applications such as the solar sail. The calculation of the momentum of light within dielectric media is somewhat controversial (see Abraham–Minkowski controversy).

=== Relativistic ===
==== Lorentz invariance ====
Newtonian physics assumes that absolute time and space exist outside of any observer; this gives rise to Galilean invariance. It also results in a prediction that the speed of light can vary from one reference frame to another. This is contrary to what has been observed. In the special theory of relativity, Einstein keeps the postulate that the equations of motion do not depend on the reference frame, but assumes that the speed of light c is invariant. As a result, position and time in two reference frames are related by the Lorentz transformation instead of the Galilean transformation.

Consider, for example, one reference frame moving relative to another at velocity v in the x direction. The Galilean transformation gives the coordinates of the moving frame as
$$\begin{align}
t' &= t, \\
x' &= x - v t,
\end{align}$$
while the Lorentz transformation gives
$$\begin{align}
t' &= \gamma \left( t - \frac{v x}{c^2} \right), \\
x' &= \gamma \left( x - v t \right),
\end{align}$$
where γ is the Lorentz factor:
$$\gamma = \frac{1}{\sqrt{1 - v^2/c^2}}.$$

Newton's second law, with mass fixed, is not invariant under a Lorentz transformation. However, it can be made invariant by making the inertial mass m of an object a function of velocity:
$$m = \gamma m_0;$$
m_{0} is the object's invariant mass.

The modified momentum,
$$\mathbf{p} = \gamma m_0 \mathbf{v},$$
obeys Newton's second law:
$$\mathbf{F} = \frac{d \mathbf{p}}{dt}.$$

Within the domain of classical mechanics, relativistic momentum closely approximates Newtonian momentum: at low velocity, γm_{0}v is approximately equal to m_{0}v, the Newtonian expression for momentum.

==== Four-vector formulation ====
In the theory of special relativity, physical quantities are expressed in terms of four-vectors that include time as a fourth coordinate along with the three space coordinates. These vectors are generally represented by capital letters, for example R for position. The expression for the four-momentum depends on how the coordinates are expressed. Time may be given in its normal units or multiplied by the speed of light so that all the components of the four-vector have dimensions of length. If the latter scaling is used, an interval of proper time, τ, defined by
$$c^2\,\text{d}\tau^2 = c^2\,\text{d}t^2 - \text{d}x^2 - \text{d}y^2 - \text{d}z^2,$$
is invariant under Lorentz transformations (in this expression and in what follows the (+ − − −) metric signature has been used, different authors use different conventions). Mathematically this invariance can be ensured in one of two ways: by treating the four-vectors as Euclidean vectors and multiplying time by √−1; or by keeping time a real quantity and embedding the vectors in a Minkowski space. In a Minkowski space, the scalar product of two four-vectors U = (U_{0}, U_{1}, U_{2}, U_{3}) and V = (V_{0}, V_{1}, V_{2}, V_{3}) is defined as
$$\mathbf{U} \cdot \mathbf{V} =  U_0 V_0 - U_1 V_1 - U_2 V_2 - U_3 V_3.$$

In all the coordinate systems, the (contravariant) relativistic four-velocity is defined by
$$\mathbf{U} \equiv \frac{\text{d}\mathbf{R}}{\text{d}\tau} = \gamma \frac{\text{d}\mathbf{R}}{\text{d}t},$$
and the (contravariant) four-momentum is
$$\mathbf{P} = m_0\mathbf{U},$$
where m_{0} is the invariant mass. If R = (ct, x, y, z) (in Minkowski space), then
$$\mathbf{P} = \gamma m_0 (c, \mathbf{v}) = (m c, \mathbf{p}).$$

Using Einstein's mass–energy equivalence, E = mc^{2}, this can be rewritten as
$$\mathbf{P} = \left(\frac{E}{c}, \mathbf{p}\right).$$

Thus, conservation of four-momentum is Lorentz-invariant and implies conservation of both mass and energy.

The magnitude of the momentum four-vector is equal to m_{0}c:
$$\|\mathbf{P}\|^2 = \mathbf{P} \cdot \mathbf{P} = \gamma^2 m_0^2 (c^2 - v^2) = (m_0c)^2,$$
and is invariant across all reference frames.

The relativistic energy–momentum relationship holds even for massless particles such as photons; by setting m_{0} = 0 it follows that
$$E = pc.$$

In a game of relativistic "billiards", if a stationary particle is hit by a moving particle in an elastic collision, the paths formed by the two afterwards will form an acute angle. This is unlike the non-relativistic case where they travel at right angles.

The four-momentum of a planar wave can be related to a wave four-vector
$$\mathbf{P} = \left(\frac{E}{c}, \mathbf{p}\right) = \hbar \mathbf{K} = \hbar \left(\frac{\omega}{c}, \mathbf{k}\right).$$

For a particle, the relationship between temporal components, E = ħω, is the Planck–Einstein relation, and the relation between spatial components, p = ħk, describes a de Broglie matter wave.

== History of the concept ==
=== Impetus ===
==== John Philoponus ====
In about 530 AD, John Philoponus developed a concept of momentum in On Physics, a commentary to Aristotle's Physics. Aristotle claimed that everything that is moving must be kept moving by something. For example, a thrown ball must be kept moving by motions of the air. Philoponus pointed out the absurdity in Aristotle's claim that motion of an object is promoted by the same air that is resisting its passage. He proposed instead that an impetus was imparted to the object in the act of throwing it.

==== Ibn Sīnā ====
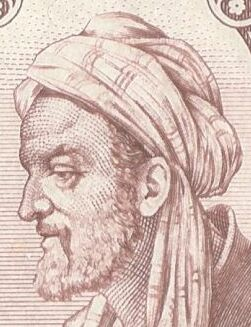
Ibn Sīnā (980–1037)

In 1020, Ibn Sīnā (also known by his Latinized name Avicenna) read Philoponus and published his own theory of motion in The Book of Healing. He agreed that an impetus is imparted to a projectile by the thrower; but unlike Philoponus, who believed that it was a temporary virtue that would decline even in a vacuum, he viewed it as a persistent, requiring external forces such as air resistance to dissipate it.

==== Peter Olivi, Jean Buridan ====
In the 13th and 14th century, Peter Olivi and Jean Buridan read and refined the work of Philoponus, and possibly that of Ibn Sīnā. Buridan, who in about 1350 was made rector of the University of Paris, referred to impetus being proportional to the weight times the speed. Moreover, Buridan's theory was different from his predecessor's in that he did not consider impetus to be self-dissipating, asserting that a body would be arrested by the forces of air resistance and gravity which might be opposing its impetus.

=== Quantity of motion ===
==== René Descartes ====
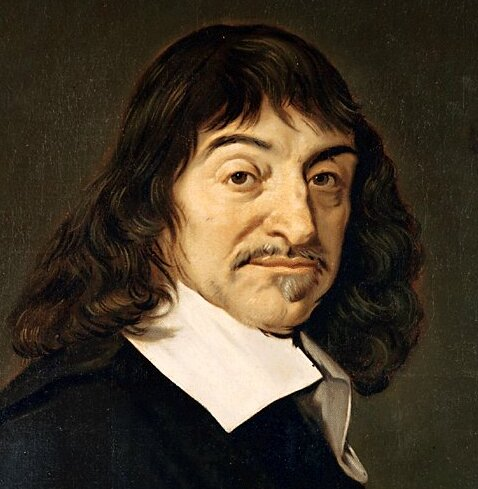
René Descartes (1596–1650)

In Principles of Philosophy (Principia Philosophiae) from 1644, the French philosopher René Descartes defined "quantity of motion" (Latin: quantitas motus) as the product of size and speed, and claimed that the total quantity of motion in the universe is conserved.

If x is twice the size of y, and is moving half as fast, then there's the same amount of motion in each.

[God] created matter, along with its motion ... merely by letting things run their course, he preserves the same amount of motion ... as he put there in the beginning.

This should not be read as a statement of the modern law of conservation of momentum, since Descartes had no concept of mass as distinct from weight and size. (The concept of mass, as distinct from weight, was introduced by Newton in 1686.) More important, he believed that it is speed rather than velocity that is conserved. So for Descartes, if a moving object were to bounce off a surface, changing its direction but not its speed, there would be no change in its quantity of motion. Galileo, in his Two New Sciences (published in 1638), used the Italian word impeto to similarly describe Descartes's quantity of motion.

==== Christiaan Huygens ====
Christiaan Huygens (1629–1695)

In the 1600s, Christiaan Huygens concluded quite early that Descartes's laws for the elastic collision of two bodies must be wrong, and he formulated the correct laws. An important step was his recognition of the Galilean invariance of the problems. His views then took many years to be circulated. He passed them on in person to William Brouncker and Christopher Wren in London, in 1661. What Spinoza wrote to Henry Oldenburg about them, in 1666 during the Second Anglo-Dutch War, was guarded. Huygens had actually worked them out in a manuscript De motu corporum ex percussione in the period 1652–1656. The war ended in 1667, and Huygens announced his results to the Royal Society in 1668. He published them in the Journal des sçavans in 1669.

=== Momentum ===
==== John Wallis ====
In 1670, John Wallis, in Mechanica sive De Motu, Tractatus Geometricus, stated the law of conservation of momentum: "the initial state of the body, either of rest or of motion, will persist" and "If the force is greater than the resistance, motion will result". Wallis used momentum for quantity of motion, and vis for force.

==== Gottfried Leibniz ====
In 1686, Gottfried Wilhelm Leibniz, in Discourse on Metaphysics, gave an argument against Descartes' construction of the conservation of the "quantity of motion" using an example of dropping blocks of different sizes different distances. He points out that force is conserved but quantity of motion, construed as the product of size and speed of an object, is not conserved.

==== Isaac Newton ====
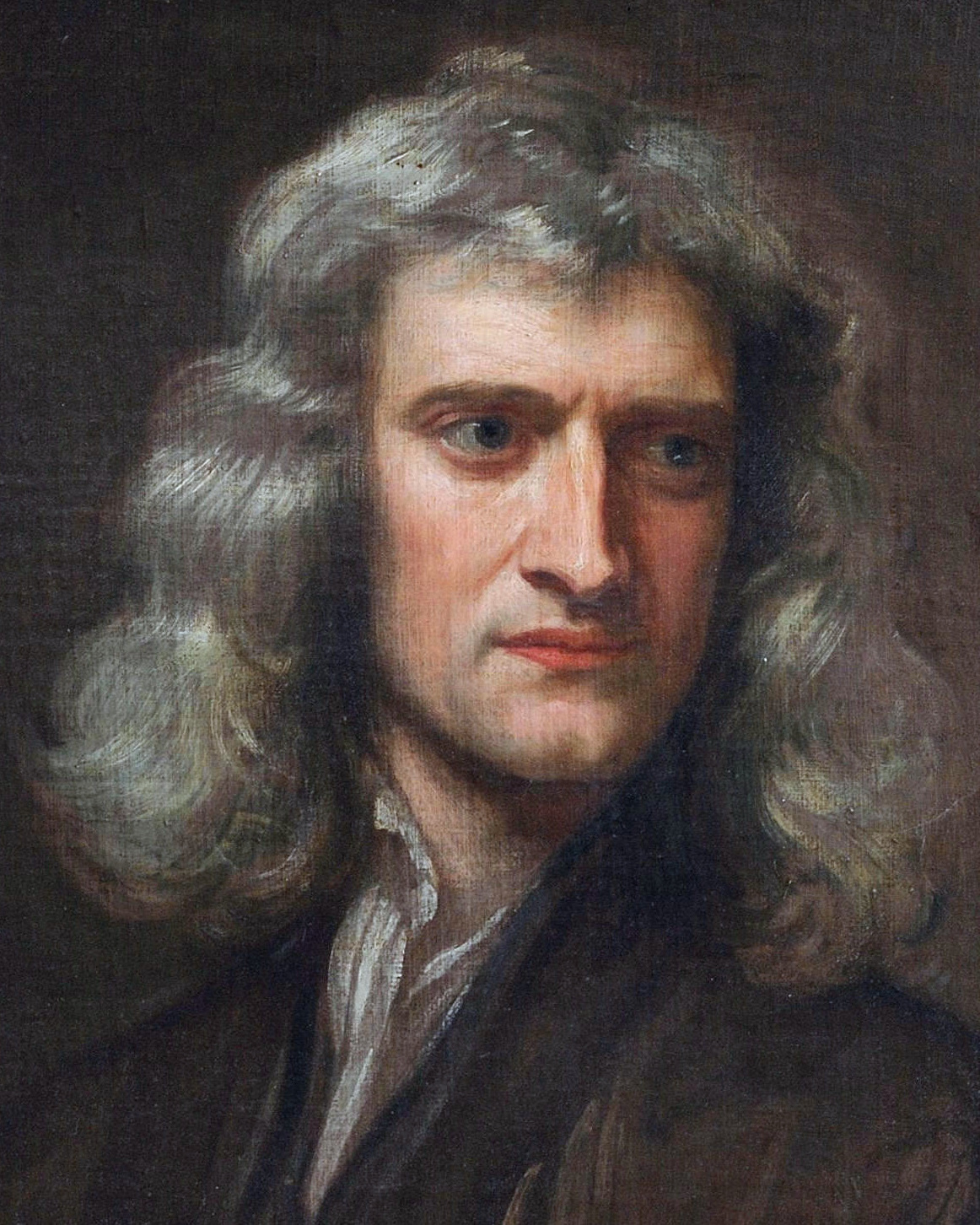
Isaac Newton (1642–1727)

In 1687, Isaac Newton, in Philosophiæ Naturalis Principia Mathematica, just like Wallis, showed a similar casting around for words to use for the mathematical momentum. His Definition II defines quantitas motus, "quantity of motion", as "arising from the velocity and quantity of matter conjointly", which identifies it as momentum. Thus when in Law II he refers to mutatio motus, "change of motion", being proportional to the force impressed, he is generally taken to mean momentum and not motion.

==== John Jennings ====
In 1721, John Jennings published Miscellanea, where the momentum in its current mathematical sense is attested, five years before the final edition of Newton's Principia Mathematica. Momentum M or "quantity of motion" was being defined for students as "a rectangle", the product of Q and V, where Q is "quantity of material" and V is "velocity", s/t.

In 1728, the Cyclopedia states:

The Momentum, Impetus, or Quantity of Motion of any Body, is the Factum [i.e., product] of its Velocity, (or the Space it moves in a given Time, see Motion) multiplied into its Mass.

== See also ==
- Angular momentum
- Crystal momentum
- Galilean cannon
- Momentum compaction
- Momentum transfer
- Newton's cradle
- Position and momentum space

== Bibliography ==
- Halliday, David; Resnick, Robert (13 August 2013). Fundamentals of Physics. John Wiley & Sons. Chapter 9. ISBN 978-1-118-23071-8.
- Dugas, René (1988). A history of mechanics. Translated into English by J.R. Maddox (Dover ed.). New York: Dover Publications. ISBN 978-0-486-65632-8.
- Feynman, Richard P.; Leighton, Robert B.; Sands, Matthew (2005). The Feynman lectures on physics, Volume 1: Mainly Mechanics, Radiation, and Heat (Definitive ed.). San Francisco, California: Pearson Addison-Wesley. ISBN 978-0-8053-9046-9.
- Feynman, Richard P.; Leighton, Robert B.; Sands, Matthew (2006). The Feynman lectures on physics (Definitive ed.). San Francisco, California: Pearson Addison-Wesley. ISBN 978-0-8053-9047-6.
- Feynman, Richard P.; Leighton, Robert B.; Sands, Matthew (2005). The Feynman lectures on physics, Volume III: Quantum Mechanics (Definitive ed.). New York: BasicBooks. ISBN 978-0-8053-9049-0.
- Goldstein, Herbert (1980). Classical mechanics (2nd ed.). Reading, Massachusetts: Addison-Wesley Publishing Company. ISBN 978-0-201-02918-5.
- Hand, Louis N.; Finch, Janet D. Analytical Mechanics. Cambridge University Press. Chapter 4.
- Jackson, John David (1975). Classical electrodynamics (2nd ed.). New York: Wiley. ISBN 978-0-471-43132-9.
- Jammer, Max (1999). Concepts of force: a study in the foundations of dynamics (Facsim ed.). Mineola, New York: Dover Publications. ISBN 978-0-486-40689-3.
- Landau, L.D.; Lifshitz, E.M. (2000). The classical theory of fields. Translated by Morton Hamermesh. English edition, reprinted with corrections (4th ed.). Oxford, England: Butterworth Heinemann. ISBN 978-0-7506-2768-9.
- Rindler, Wolfgang (1986). Essential Relativity: Special, general and cosmological (2nd ed.). New York: Springer. ISBN 978-0-387-10090-6.
- Serway, Raymond; Jewett, John (2003). Physics for Scientists and Engineers (6th ed.). Brooks Cole. ISBN 978-0-534-40842-8.
- Stenger, Victor J. (2000). Timeless Reality: Symmetry, Simplicity, and Multiple Universes. Prometheus Books. pp. Chapter 12 in particular.
- Tipler, Paul (1998). Physics for Scientists and Engineers: Vol. 1: Mechanics, Oscillations and Waves, Thermodynamics (4th ed.). W.H. Freeman. ISBN 978-1-57259-492-0.
- Tritton, D.J. (2006). Physical fluid dynamics (2nd ed.). Oxford, England: Clarendon Press. p. 58. ISBN 978-0-19-854493-7.
