= Friedrich Krupp (disambiguation) =

Friedrich Krupp (1787–1826) was a German industrialist.

Friedrich Krupp may refer to:

- Friedrich Alfred Krupp (1854–1902), German industrialist
- Friedrich Krupp Germaniawerft, German shipbuilding firm

== See also ==
- Krupp
