= Alfred Krupp (disambiguation) =

Alfred Krupp (1812–1887) was a German industrialist.

Alfred Krupp may refer to:

- Friedrich Alfred Krupp (1854–1902), German industrialist
- Alfried Krupp von Bohlen und Halbach (1907–1967), German industrialist

== See also ==
- Krupp
