= Villa Hügel =

Villa in Essen, Germany

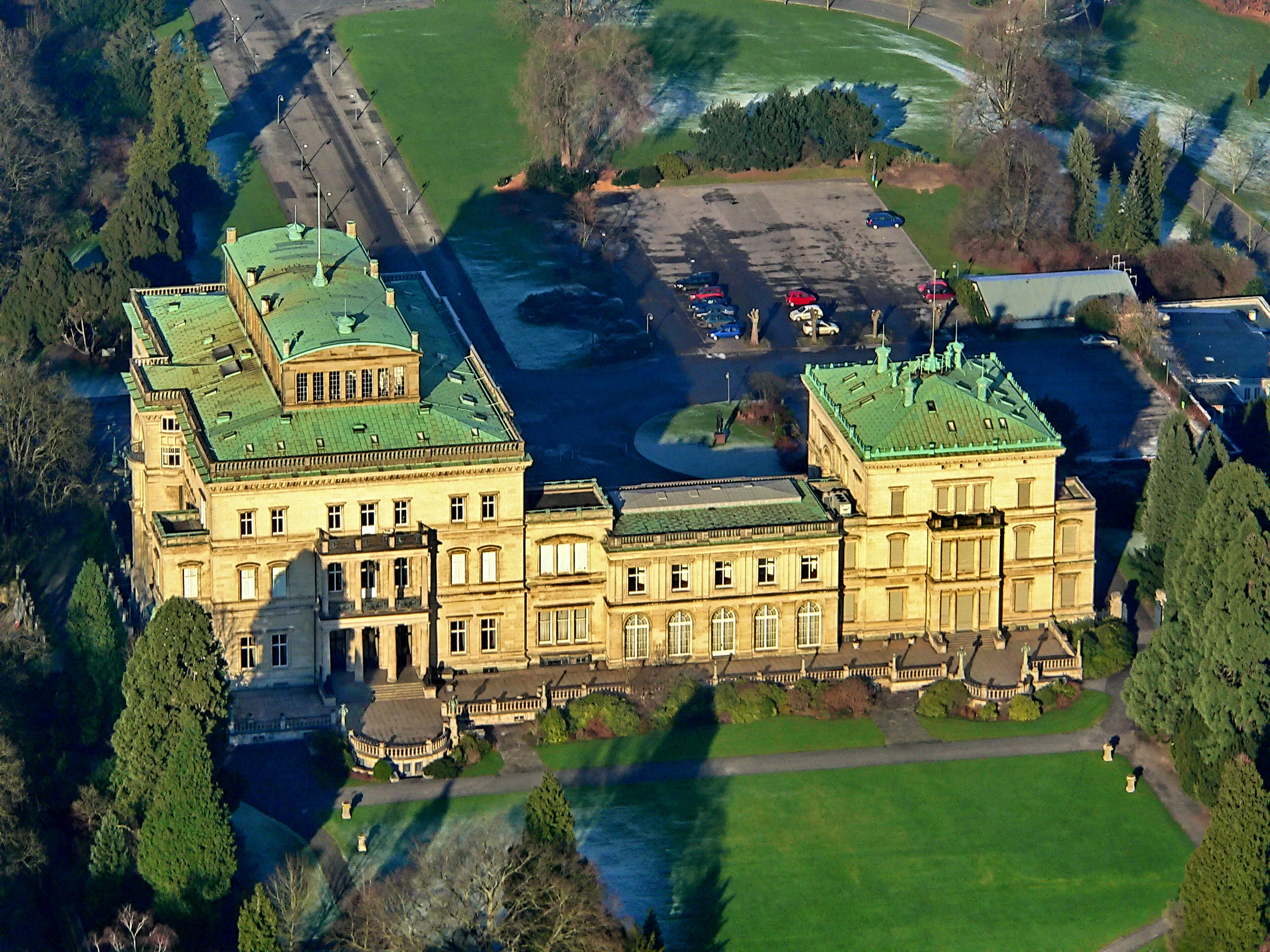
- The main complex

- Location within Germany

General information
- Type: Villa
- Architectural style: Neoclassical
- Location: Essen, Germany
- Coordinates: 51°24′25″N 7°00′30″E
- Groundbreaking: April 1870
- Completed: 1873
- Client: Alfred Krupp
- Owner: Alfried Krupp von Bohlen und Halbach Foundation

Other information
- Number of rooms: 269

The Villa Hügel is a 19th-century mansion in Bredeney, now part of Essen, Germany. It was built by the industrialist Alfred Krupp in 1870–1873 as his main residence and was the home of the Krupp family until after World War II. More recently, the Villa Hügel has housed the offices of the Kulturstiftung Ruhr (Ruhr Cultural Foundation), an art gallery, the historical archive of the Krupp family and company, and a concert venue.

Hügel simply means "hill", as the villa sits atop a hill. It was sometimes named Villa Krupp, after the family.

== History ==
In 1864 Alfred Krupp purchased the Klosterbuschhof on the heights above Bredeney and had it rebuilt as a residence for his family. Over the following years, Krupp bought additional land around the estate and in 1869 placed an advertisement in Deutsche Bauzeitung looking for an architect who would turn his designs for a "large villa" into a viable blueprint. In the event, a number of architects worked on the project over the following years. Krupp himself continually intervened in the work with new ideas. His focus was very much on a modern and efficient house: design elements were secondary to him and he deemed most ornamental architectural features superfluous.

The foundations were laid in April 1870 and up to 800 people worked on the construction project at a time. Since Alfred Krupp wanted a very modern home, the villa was intended to be fire-proof and well insulated from sun, wind, cold and heat. It featured double-paned windows, water heating and an early form of air conditioning. The temperature was intended to be independently adjustable for each room. A large complex of support buildings was erected nearby, including private water and gas works.

Krupp pushed for a speedy completion, although the Franco-Prussian War and collapsing mining tunnels underneath the edifice slowed construction. On 10 January 1873, the family moved in; some of the technical features did not work as expected, however, so work continued after that.

Krupp located his own room immediately above the stables, as he believed the smell of horse manure stimulated the imagination. He even went as far as boring a tube through the ceiling to allow the smell to filter in.

Alfred Krupp died in 1887. The family continued to use the Villa Hügel and Friedrich Alfred Krupp and his wife Margarethe made some significant changes to the house, adding sumptuous ornamentation. Among other heads of state and monarchs, Emperor Wilhelm II stayed at the Villa Hügel seven times and visited 9 times. The current appearance of the villa is mostly due to the next generation of Krupps, Friedrich Alfred's daughter Bertha and her husband Gustav Krupp von Bohlen und Halbach, who hired Ernst von Ihne to work on the building after 1912. He added wooden paneling to the interior and the owners furnished the villa with numerous works of art.

An annex called the Little House (Kleines Haus) containing sixty rooms was used to confine Alfried Krupp in the aftermath of the Second World War. Some parts of the villa were used to house members of the British post-war Control Commission, Germany (CCG) during 1946.

== Description ==
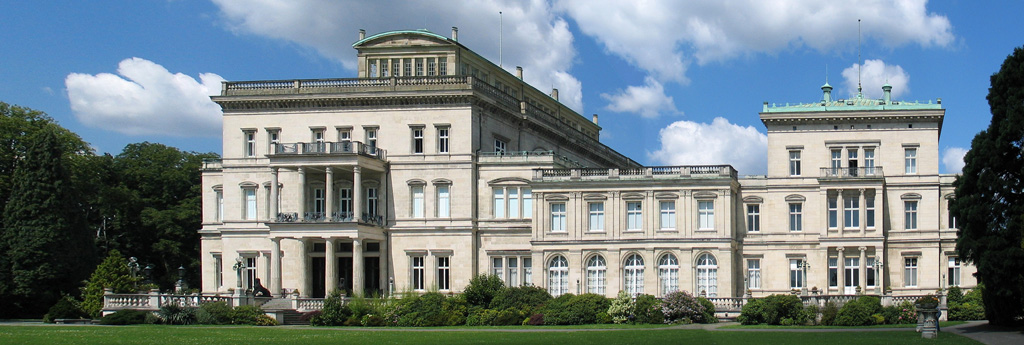
Villa Hügel

The house has 269 rooms and occupies 8,100 m^{2} (87,000 sq ft). It is situated in a 28-hectare (69-acre) park that overlooks the River Ruhr and the Baldeneysee.

The main complex consists of the three-storied Wohnhaus ('residence') – topped by a belvedere, which originally contained the air conditioning ducts – and a three-storied Logierhaus ('lodging house'). The two were linked by a winter garden, now a two-storied building. The construction is supported by an iron framework, which was very modern for the time. The overall style of the original building was a very austere example of a late-Neoclassical villa; later changes added more ornamentation. The interior of the main building's ground and second floors is dominated by the main hall of over 400 m^{2} (4,300 sq ft). By contrast, the rooms of the first floor (which is not open to the public) were kept relatively simple.

== Today ==
In 1953 the Krupp family opened their former residence to the public. Exhibitions have been held here since then. The Villa Hügel also served as a place of representation for the Krupp Group. In 1984, Berthold Beitz set up the Ruhr Cultural Foundation, which organizes major art and cultural exhibitions in the villa. The main building with many historical rooms can be visited today. The Krupp historical exhibition is housed in the adjoining building, the so-called Little House. The Krupp archive has also been located in the villa since 1905.

The hall is also the regular concert venue of Folkwang Kammerorchester Essen, a chamber orchestra.

== See also ==
- Via Krupp, Italy: commissioned by Alfred Krupp's son
