= Krupp family =

German dynasty from Essen

- Business family
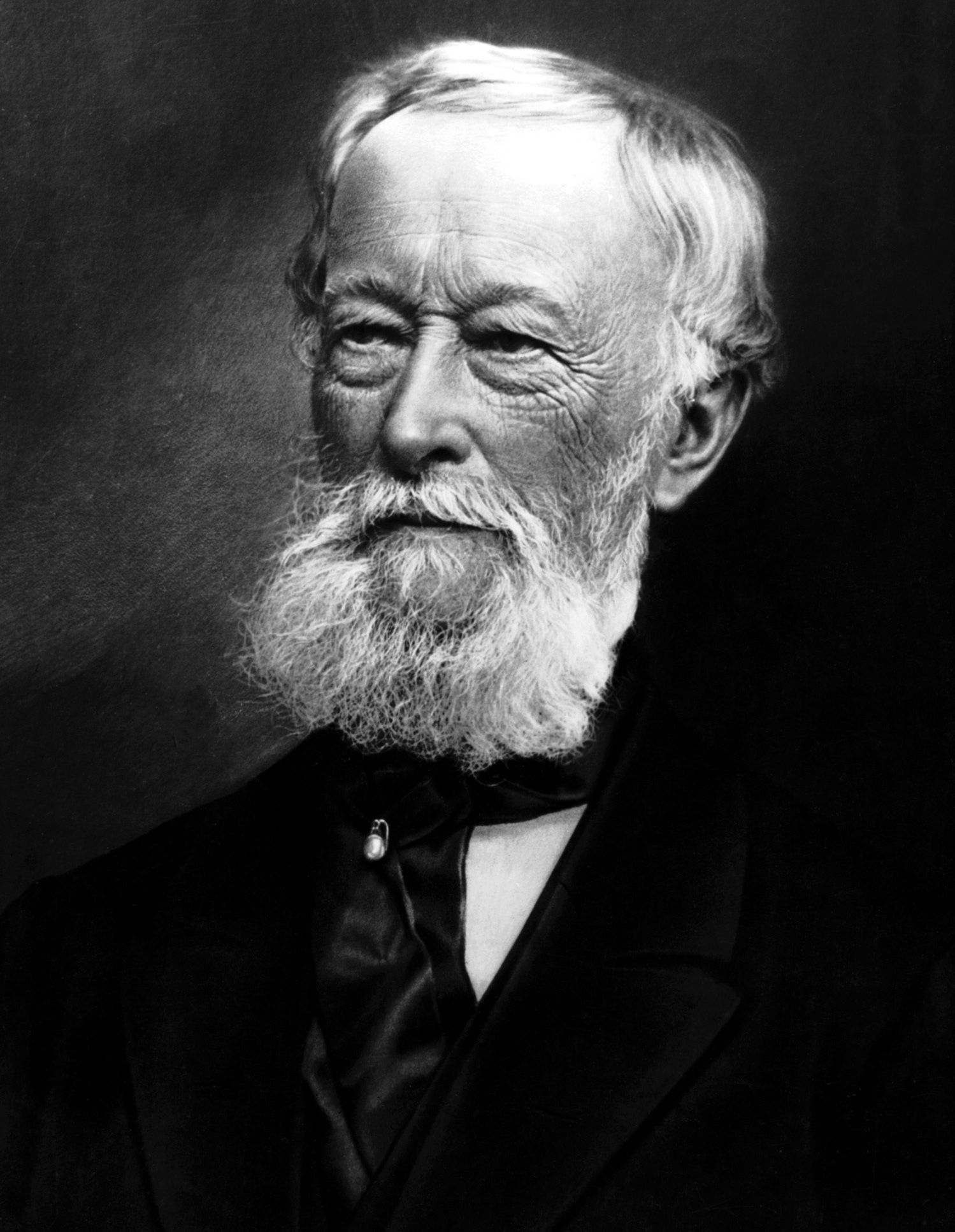
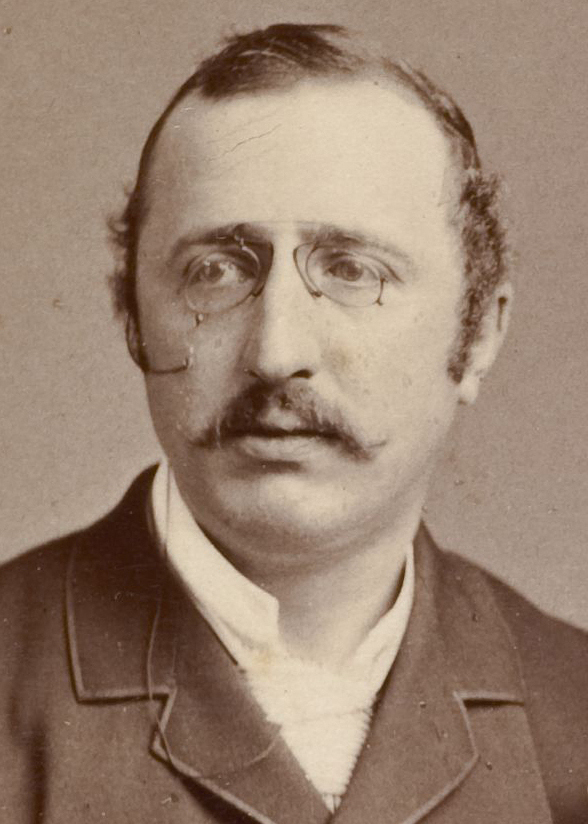
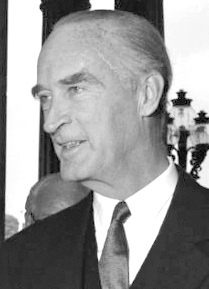
- Alfred Krupp Friedrich Alfred Krupp Alfried Krupp
- Current region: Ruhr, Germany
- Origin: Essen, North Rhine-Westphalia, Germany
- Founded: 439 years ago
- Founder: Arndt Krupp
- Estate: Villa Hügel

The Krupp family is a prominent 400-year-old German dynasty from Essen, noted for its production of steel, artillery, ammunition and other armaments.

The dynasty began in 1587 when trader Arndt Krupp moved to Essen and joined the merchants' guild. He bought and sold real estate, and became one of the city's richest men. His descendants produced small guns during the Thirty Years' War and eventually acquired fulling mills, coal mines and an iron forge. During the Napoleonic Wars, Friedrich Krupp founded the Gusstahlfabrik (cast steel works) and started smelted steel production in 1816. This led to the company becoming a major industrial power and laid the foundation for the steel empire that would come to dominate the world for nearly a century under his son Alfred. The Krupp family business became the arms manufacturer for the Kingdom of Prussia in 1859, and later the German Empire.

== Early history ==
The Krupp family first appeared in the historical record in 1587, when Arndt Krupp joined the merchants' guild in Essen. Arndt, a trader, arrived in town just before an outbreak of plague and became one of the city's wealthiest men by purchasing the property of families who fled the epidemic. After he died in 1624, his son Anton took over the family business; Anton oversaw a gunsmithing operation during the Thirty Years' War (1618–1648), which was the first instance of the family's long association with arms manufacturing.

For the next century the Krupps continued to acquire property and became involved in municipal politics in Essen. By the mid-18th-century, Friedrich Jodocus Krupp, Arndt's great-great-grandson, headed the Krupp family. In 1751, he married Helene Amalie Ascherfeld (another of Arndt's great-great-grandchildren); Jodocus died six years later, which left his widow to run the business: a family first. The widow Krupp greatly expanded the family's holdings over the decades, acquiring a fulling mill, shares in four coal mines, and (in 1800) an iron forge located on a stream near Essen.

== Friedrich's era ==
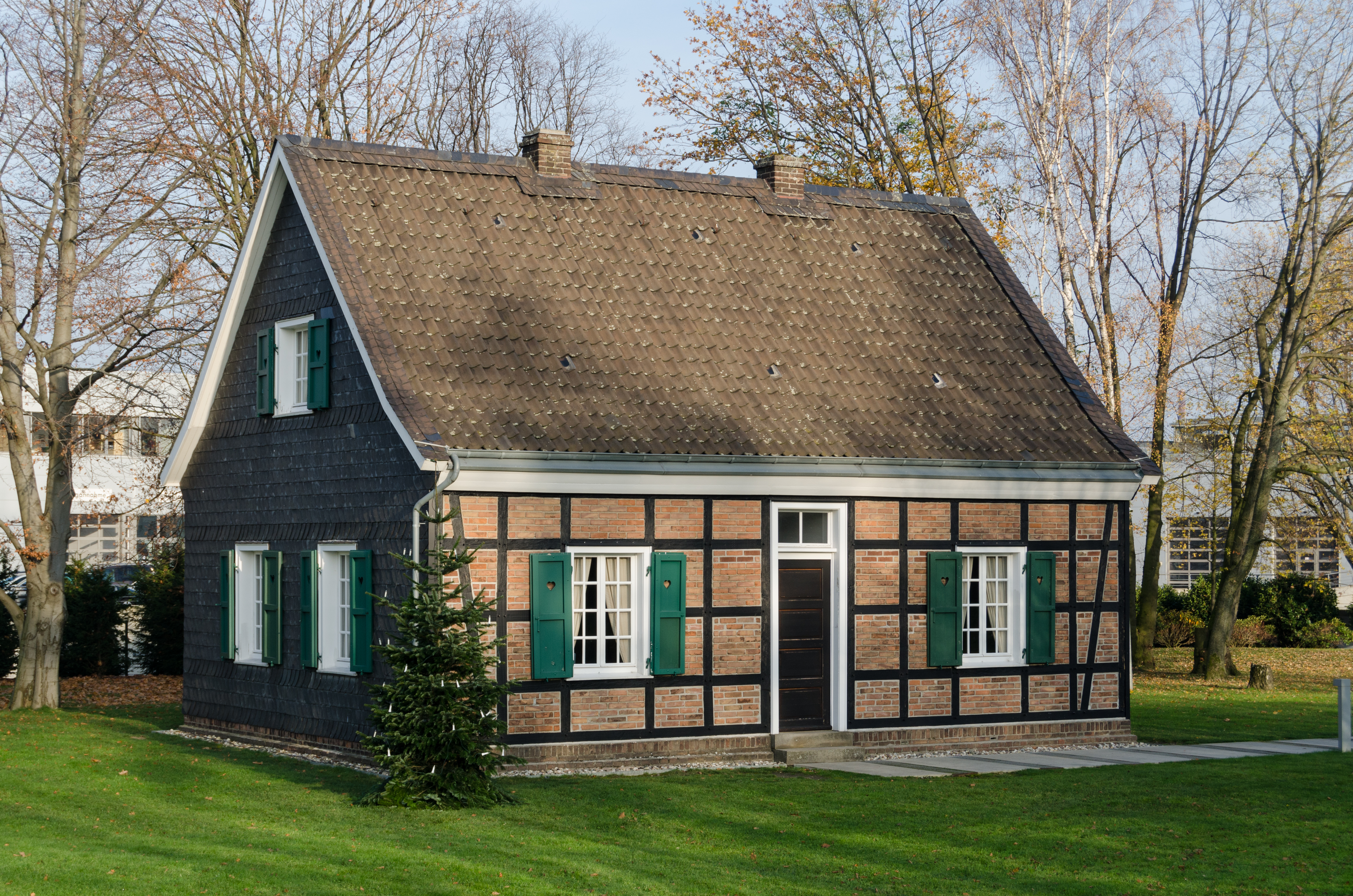
Historic Krupp House

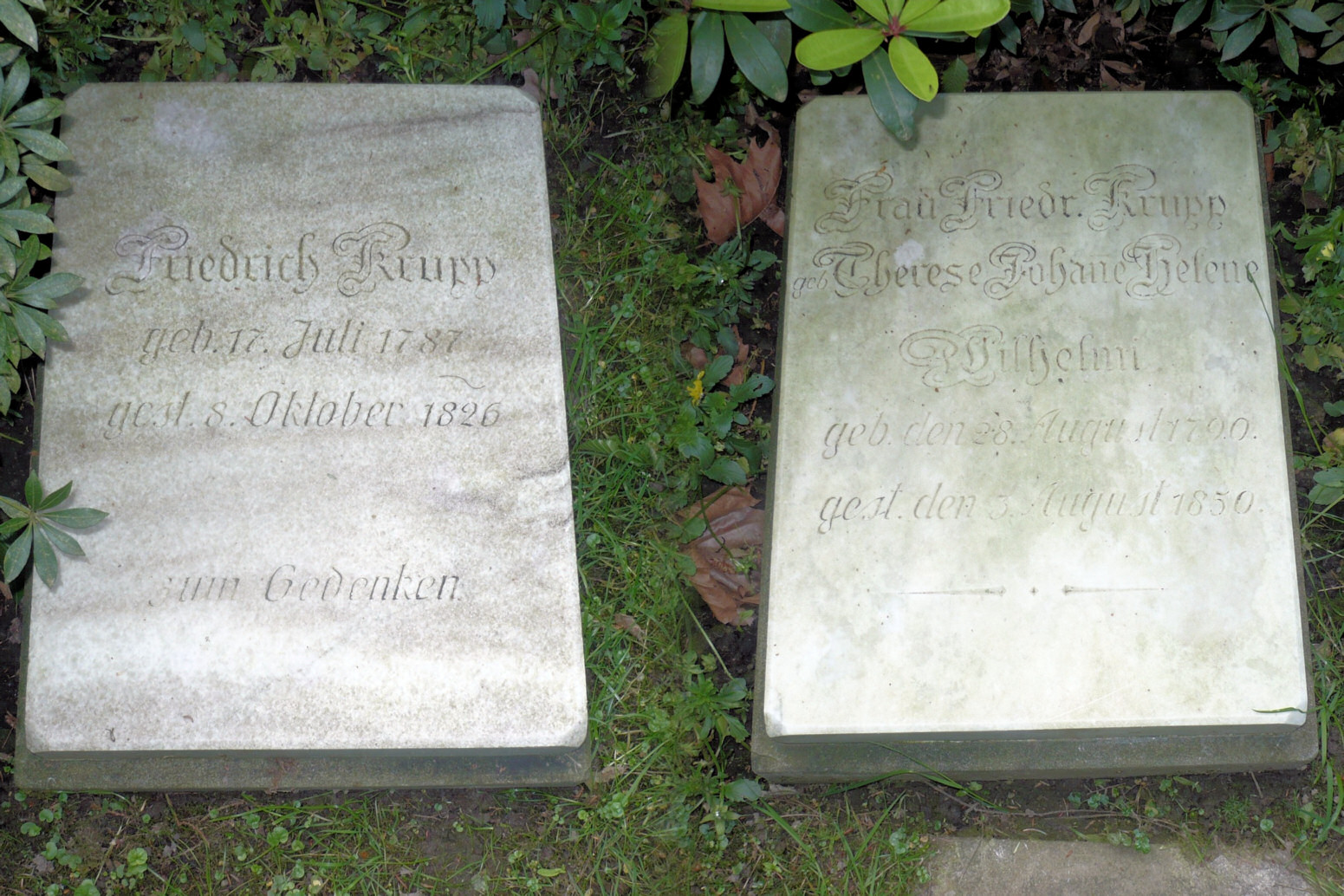
Gravestones of Friedrich Krupp and wife Therese Wilhelmi at Essen's Friedhof Bredeney

In 1807 the progenitor of the modern Krupp firm, Friedrich Krupp, began his commercial career at age 19 when the Widow Krupp appointed him manager of the forge. Friedrich's father, the widow's son, had died 11 years previously; since that time, the widow had tutored the boy in the ways of commerce, as he seemed the logical family heir. Unfortunately, Friedrich proved too ambitious for his own good, and quickly ran the formerly profitable forge into the ground. The widow soon had to sell it away.

In 1810, the widow died, and in what would prove a disastrous move, left virtually all the Krupp fortune and property to Friedrich. Newly enriched, Friedrich decided to discover the secret of cast (crucible) steel. Benjamin Huntsman, a clockmaker from Sheffield, had pioneered a process to make crucible steel in 1740, but the British had managed to keep it secret, forcing others to import steel. When Napoleon began his blockade of the British Empire (see Continental System), British steel became unavailable, and Napoleon offered a prize of four thousand francs to anyone who could replicate the British process. This prize piqued Friedrich's interest.

Thus, in 1811 Friedrich founded the Krupp Gussstahlfabrik (Cast Steel Works). He realized he would need a large facility with a power source for success, and so he built a mill and foundry on the Ruhr River, which unfortunately proved an unreliable stream. Friedrich spent a significant amount of time and money in the small, waterwheel-powered facility, neglecting other Krupp business, but in 1816 he was able to produce smelted steel. He died in Essen, 8 October 1826 age 39.

== Alfred's era ==
Alfred Krupp (born Alfried Felix Alwyn Krupp), son of Friedrich Carl, was born in Essen in 1812. His father's death forced him to leave school at the age of fourteen and take on responsibility for the steel works in companionship with his mother Therese Krupp. Prospects were daunting: his father had spent a considerable fortune in the attempt to cast steel in large ingots, and to keep the works going the widow and family lived in extreme frugality. The young director laboured alongside the workmen by day and carried on his father's experiments at night, while occasionally touring Europe trying to promote Krupp products and make sales. It was during a stay in England that young Alfried became enamored of the country and adopted the English spelling of his name.

For years, the works made barely enough money to cover the workmen's wages. Then, in 1841, Alfred's brother Hermann invented the spoon-roller—which Alfred patented, bringing in enough money to enlarge the factory, steel production, and cast steel blocks. In 1847 Krupp made his first cannon of cast steel. At the Great Exhibition (London) of 1851, he exhibited a 6 pounder made entirely from cast steel, and a solid flawless ingot of steel weighing 4,300 pounds (2,000 kg), more than twice as much as any previously cast. He surpassed this with a 100,000-pound (45,000 kg) ingot for the Paris Exposition in 1855. Krupp's exhibits caused a sensation in the engineering world, and the Essen works became famous.

In 1851, another successful innovation, no-weld railway tyres, began the company's primary revenue stream, from sales to railways in the United States. Alfred enlarged the factory and fulfilled his long-cherished scheme to construct a breech-loading cannon of cast steel. He strongly believed in the superiority of breech-loaders, on account of improved accuracy and speed, but this view did not win general acceptance among military officers, who remained loyal to tried-and-true muzzle-loaded bronze cannon. Alfred soon began producing breech loading howitzers, one of which he gifted to the Prussian court.

Indeed, unable to sell his steel cannon, Krupp gave it to the King of Prussia, who used it as a decorative piece. The king's brother Wilhelm, however, realized the significance of the innovation. After he became regent in 1859, Prussia bought its first 312 steel cannon from Krupp, which became the main arms manufacturer for the Prussian military.

Prussia used the advanced technology of Krupp to defeat both Austria and France in the German Wars of Unification. The French high command refused to purchase Krupp guns despite Napoleon III's support. The Franco-Prussian War was in part a contest of "Kruppstahl" versus bronze cannon. The success of German artillery spurred the first international arms race, against Schneider-Creusot in France and Armstrong in England. Krupp was able to sell, alternately, improved artillery and improved steel shielding to countries from Russia to Chile to Thailand (formerly known as Siam).

In the Panic of 1873, Alfred continued to expand, including the purchase of Spanish mines and Dutch shipping, making Krupp the biggest and richest company in Europe but nearly bankrupting it. He was bailed out with a 30 million Mark loan from a consortium of banks arranged by the Prussian State Bank.

In 1878 and 1879 Krupp held competitions known as Völkerschiessen, which were firing demonstrations of cannon for international buyers. These were held in Meppen, at the largest proving ground in the world; privately owned by Krupp. He took on 46 nations as customers. At the time of his death in 1887, he had 75,000 employees, including 20,200 in Essen. In his lifetime, Krupp manufactured a total of 24,576 guns; 10,666 for the German government and 13,910 for export.

Krupp established the Generalregulativ as the firm's basic constitution. The company was a sole proprietorship, inherited by primogeniture, with strict control of workers. Krupp demanded a loyalty oath, required workers to obtain written permission from their foremen when they needed to use the toilet and issued proclamations telling his workers not to concern themselves with national politics. In return, Krupp provided social services that were unusually liberal for the era, including "colonies" with parks, schools and recreation grounds - while the widows' and orphans' and other benefit schemes insured the men and their families in case of illness or death. Essen became a large company town and Krupp became a de facto state within a state, with "Kruppianer" as loyal to the company and the Krupp family as to the nation and the Hohenzollern family. Krupp's paternalist strategy was adopted by Bismarck as government policy, as a preventive against Social Democratic tendencies, and later influenced the development and adoption of Führerprinzip by Adolf Hitler.

The Krupp social services programme began about 1861, when it was found that there were not sufficient houses in the town for firm employees, and the firm began building dwellings. By 1862 ten houses were ready for foremen, and in 1863 the first houses for workingmen were built in Alt Westend. Neu Westend was built in 1871 and 1872. By 1905, 400 houses were provided, many being given rent free to widows of former workers. A cooperative society was founded in 1868 which became the Consum-Anstalt. Profits were divided according to amounts purchased. A boarding house for single men, the Ménage, was started in 1865 with 200 boarders and by 1905 accommodated 1000. Bath houses were provided and employees received free medical services. Accident, life, and sickness insurance societies were formed, and the firm contributed to their support. Technical and manual training schools were provided.

Krupp was also held in high esteem by the kaiser, who dismissed Julius von Verdy du Vernois and his successor Hans von Kaltenborn for rejecting Krupp's design of the C-96 field gun, quipping, "I've canned three War Ministers because of Krupp, and still they don't catch on!"

Krupp's marriage was not a happy one. His wife Bertha (not to be confused with their granddaughter), was unwilling to remain in polluted Essen in Villa Hügel, the mansion which Krupp designed. She spent most of their married years in resorts and spas, with their only child, a son.

== Friedrich Alfred's era ==
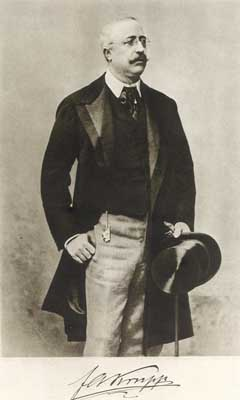
Friedrich Alfred Krupp, 1900.

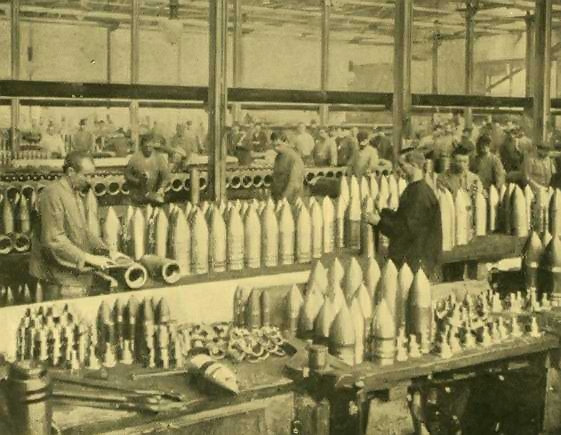
Workers in 1905.

After Krupp's death in 1887, his only son, Friedrich Alfred, carried on the work. The father had been a hard man, known as "Herr Krupp" since his early teens. Friedrich Alfred was called "Fritz" all his life, and was strikingly dissimilar to his father in appearance and personality. He was a philanthropist, a rarity amongst Ruhr industrial leaders. Part of his philanthropy supported the study of eugenics. He was particularly interested in promoting the application of genetics to social science and public policy.

Fritz was a skilled businessman, though of a different sort from his father. Fritz was a master of the subtle sell, and cultivated a close rapport with the Kaiser, Wilhelm II. Under Fritz's management, the firm's business blossomed further and further afield, spreading across the globe. He focused on arms manufacturing, as the US railroad market purchased from its own growing steel industry.

Fritz Krupp authorized many new products that would do much to change history. In 1890 Krupp developed nickel steel, which was hard enough to allow thin battleship armor and cannon using Nobel's improved gunpowder. In 1892, Krupp bought Gruson in a hostile takeover. It became Krupp-Panzer and manufactured armor plate and ships' turrets. In 1893 Rudolf Diesel brought his new engine to Krupp to construct. In 1896 Krupp bought Germaniawerft in Kiel, which became Germany's main warship builder and built the first German U-boat in 1906.

Fritz married Magda and they had two daughters: Bertha (1886–1957) and Barbara (1887–1972); the latter married Tilo Freiherr von Wilmowsky (1878–1966) in 1907.

Fritz was arrested on 15 October 1902 by Italian police at his retreat on the Mediterranean island of Capri, where he enjoyed the companionship of forty or so adolescent Italian boys. He had a subsequent publicity disaster and was found dead in his chambers not long after. It was alleged suicide, but foul play was suspected and details of the event were vague. His wife was institutionalized for insanity.

== Gustav's era ==
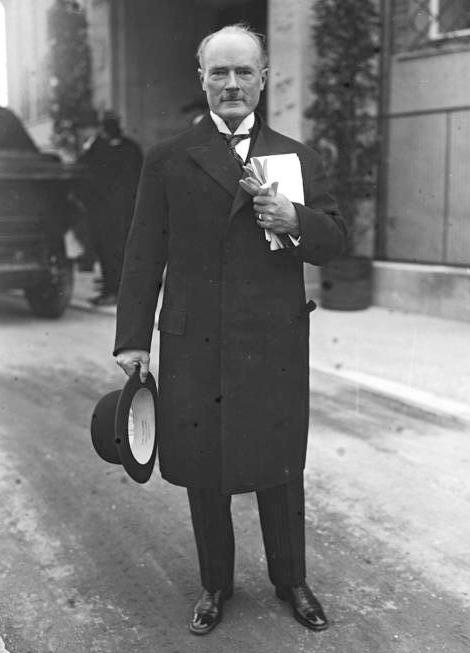
Gustav Krupp von Bohlen und Halbach (1931)

Upon Fritz's death, his teenage daughter Bertha inherited the firm. In 1903, the firm formally incorporated as a joint-stock company, Fried. Krupp Grusonwerk AG. However, Bertha owned all but four shares. Kaiser Wilhelm II felt it was unthinkable for the Krupp firm to be run by a woman. He arranged for Bertha to marry Gustav von Bohlen und Halbach, a Prussian courtier to the Vatican and grandson of American Civil War General Henry Bohlen. By imperial proclamation at the wedding, Gustav was given the additional surname "Krupp," which was to be inherited by primogeniture along with the company.

In 1911, Gustav bought Hamm Wireworks to manufacture barbed wire. In 1912, Krupp began manufacturing stainless steel. At this time 50% of Krupp's armaments were sold to Germany, and the rest to 52 other nations. The company had invested worldwide, including in cartels with other international companies. Essen was the company headquarters. In 1913 Germany jailed a number of military officers for selling secrets to Krupp, in what was known as the Kornwalzer scandal. Gustav was not himself penalized and fired only a single director, Otto Eccius.

After Archduke Franz Ferdinand was assassinated in 1914, Krupp bought his hunting lodge Schloss Blühnbach, in Werfen in the Austrian Alps, and which was a former residence of the Archbishops of Salzburg.

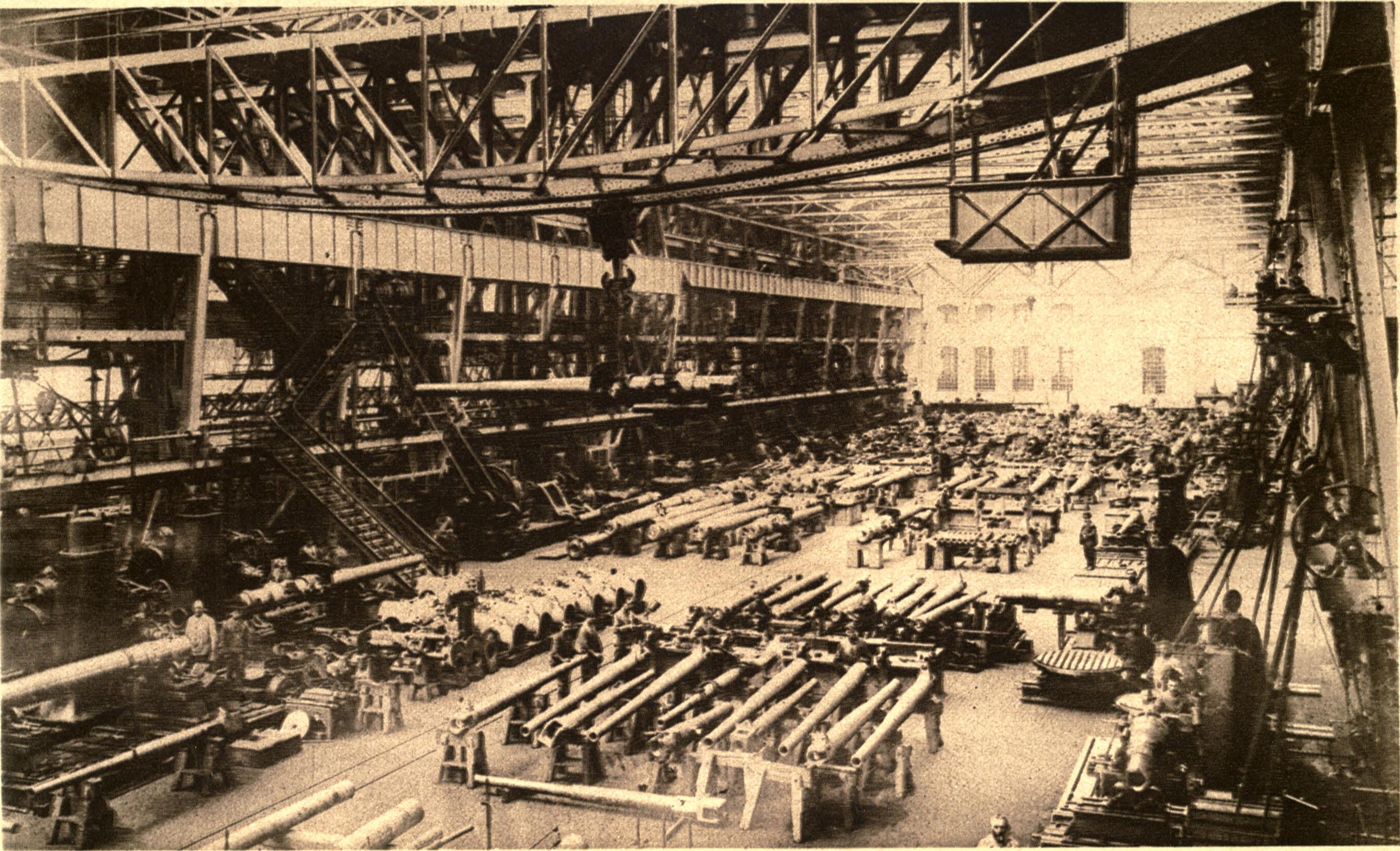
The Krupp Gun Works during World War I

Gustav led the firm through World War I, concentrating almost entirely on artillery manufacturing, particularly following the loss of overseas markets as a result of the Allied blockade. Vickers of England naturally suspended royalty payments during the war (Krupp held the patent on shell fuses, but back-payment was made in 1926).

In 1916, the German government seized Belgian industry and conscripted Belgian civilians for forced labor in the Ruhr. These were novelties in modern warfare and in violation of the Hague Conventions, to which Germany was a signatory. During the war, Friedrich Krupp Germaniawerft produced 84 U-boats for the German navy, as well as the Deutschland submarine freighter, intended to ship raw material to Germany despite the blockade. In 1918 the Allies named Gustav a war criminal, but the trials never proceeded.

After the war, the firm was forced to renounce arms manufacturing. Gustav attempted to reorient to consumer products, under the slogan "Wir machen alles!" (we make everything!), but operated at a loss for years. The company laid off 70,000 workers but was able to stave off Socialist unrest by continuing severance pay and its famous social services for workers. The company opened a dental hospital to provide steel teeth and jaws for wounded veterans. It received its first contract from the Prussian State railway, and manufactured its first locomotive.

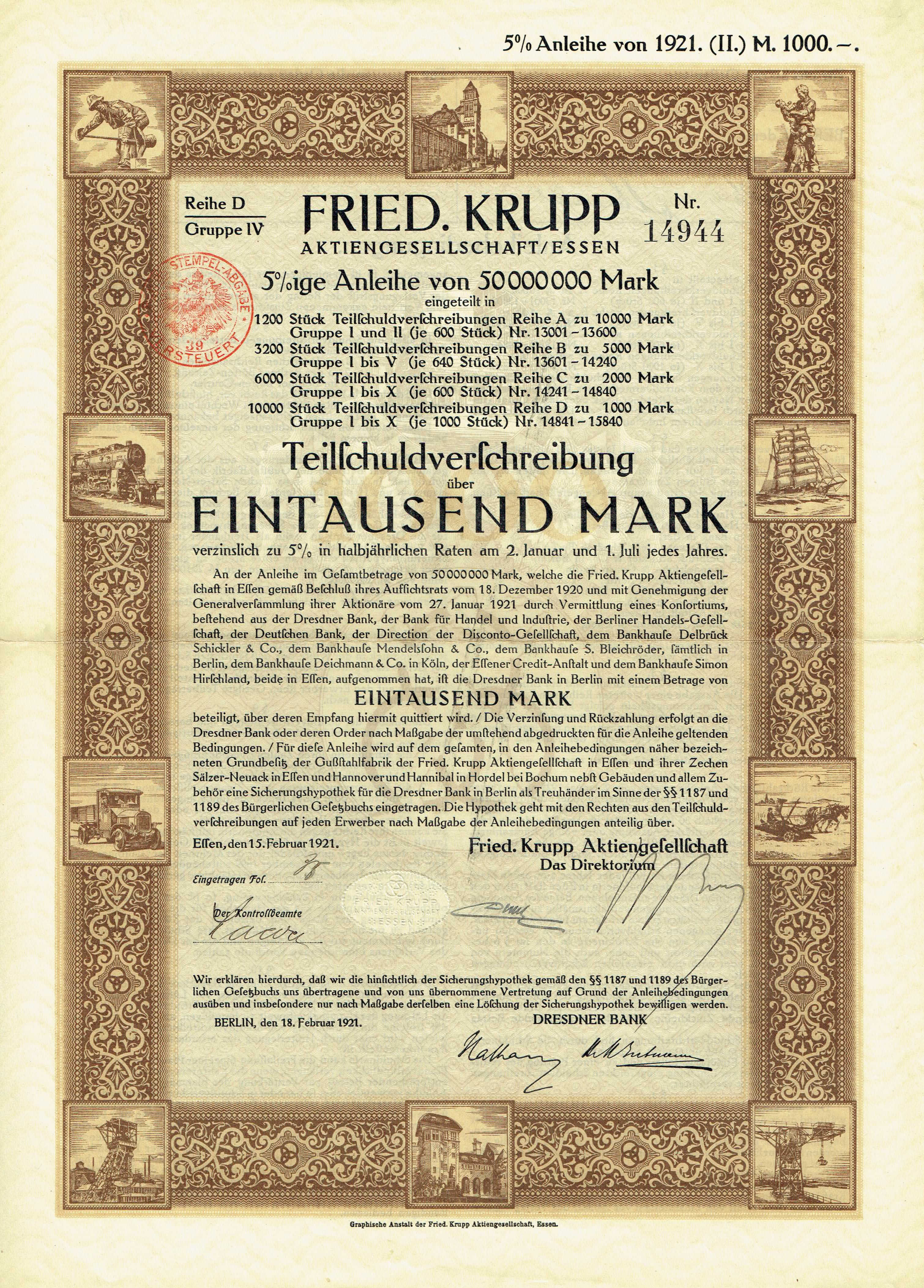
Bond of the Fried. Krupp AG, issued 15. February 1921

In 1920, the Ruhr Uprising occurred in reaction to the Kapp Putsch. The Ruhr Red Army, or Rote Soldatenbund, took over much of the demilitarized Rhineland unopposed. Krupp's factory in Essen was occupied, and independent republics were declared, but the German Reichswehr invaded from Westphalia and quickly restored order. Later in the year, Britain oversaw the dismantling of much of Krupp's factory, reducing capacity by half and shipping industrial equipment to France as war reparations.

In the hyperinflation of 1923, the firm printed Kruppmarks for use in Essen, where it was the only stable currency. France and Belgium occupied the Ruhr and established martial law. French soldiers inspecting Krupp's factory in Essen were cornered by workers in a garage, opened fire with a machine gun, and killed thirteen. This incident spurred reprisal killings and sabotage across the Rhineland, and when Krupp held a large, public funeral for the workers, he was fined and jailed by the French. This made him a national hero, and he was granted an amnesty by the French after seven months.

Although Krupp was a monarchist at heart, he cooperated with the Weimar Republic; as a munitions manufacturer his first loyalty was to the government in power. He was deeply involved with the Reichswehr's evasion of the Treaty of Versailles, and secretly engaged in arms design and manufacture. In 1921 Krupp bought Bofors in Sweden as a front company and sold arms to neutral nations including the Netherlands and Denmark. In 1922, Krupp established Suderius AG in the Netherlands, as a front company for shipbuilding, and sold submarine designs to neutrals including the Netherlands, Spain, Turkey, Finland, and Japan. German Chancellor Wirth arranged for Krupp to secretly continue designing artillery and tanks, coordinating with army chief von Seeckt and navy chief Paul Behncke. Krupp was able to hide this activity from Allied inspectors for five years, and kept up his engineers' skills by hiring them out to Eastern European governments including Russia.

In 1924, the Raw Steel Association (Rohstahlgemeinschaft) was established in Luxembourg, as a quota-fixing cartel for coal and steel, by France, Britain, Belgium, Luxembourg, Austria, Czechoslovakia, and Germany. Germany, however, chose to violate quotas and pay fines, in order to monopolize the Ruhr's output and continue making high-grade steel. In 1926, Krupp began the manufacture of Widia ("Wie Diamant") cobalt-tungsten carbide. In 1928, German industry under Krupp leadership put down a general strike, locking out 250,000 workers, and encouraging the government to cut wages 15%. In 1929, the Chrysler Building was capped with Krupp steel.

Gustav and especially Bertha were initially skeptical of Hitler, who was not of their class. Gustav's skepticism toward the Nazis waned when Hitler dropped plans to nationalize business, the Communists gained seats in the 6 November elections, and Chancellor Kurt von Schleicher suggested a planned economy with price controls. Despite this, as late as the day before President Paul von Hindenburg appointed Hitler Chancellor, Gustav warned him not to do so. However, after Hitler won power, Gustav became enamoured with the Nazis (Fritz Thyssen described him as "a super-Nazi") to a degree his wife and subordinates found bizarre.

In 1933, Hitler made Gustav chairman of the Reich Federation of German Industry. Gustav ousted Jews from the organization and disbanded the board, establishing himself as the sole-decision maker. Hitler visited Gustav just before the Röhm purge in 1934, which among other things eliminated many of those who actually believed in the "socialism" of "National Socialism." Gustav supported the "Adolf Hitler Endowment Fund of German Industry", administered by Bormann, who used it to collect millions of Marks from German businessmen. As part of Hitler's secret rearmament program, Krupp expanded from 35,000 to 112,000 employees.

Gustav was alarmed at Hitler's aggressive foreign policy after the Munich Agreement, but by then he was fast succumbing to senility and was effectively displaced by his son Alfried. He was indicted as a major war criminal at the Nuremberg Trials but never tried, due to his advanced dementia. He was thus the only German to be accused of being a war criminal after both world wars. He was nursed by his wife in a roadside inn near Blühnbach until his death in 1950, and then cremated and interred quietly, since his adopted name was at that time one of the most notorious in the American Zone.

== Alfried's era ==
As the eldest son of Bertha Krupp, Alfried was destined by family tradition to become the sole heir of the Krupp concern. An amateur photographer and Olympic sailor, he was an early supporter of Nazism among German industrialists, joining the SS in 1931, and never disavowing his allegiance to Hitler. According to Manchester, he kept a copy of Mein Kampf on his bedside table to the day of his death.

His father's health began to decline in 1939, and after a stroke in 1941, Alfried took over full control of the firm, continuing its role as main arms supplier to Germany at war. In 1943, Hitler decreed the Lex Krupp, authorizing the transfer of all Bertha's shares to Alfried, giving him the name "Krupp" and dispossessing his siblings.

During the war, Krupp was allowed to take over many industries in occupied nations, including Arthur Krupp steel works in Berndorf, Austria, the Alsacian Corporation for Mechanical Construction (Elsaessische Maschinenfabrik AG, or ELMAG), Robert Rothschild's tractor factory in France, Škoda Works in Czechoslovakia, and Deutsche Schiff- und Maschinenbau AG (Deschimag) in Bremen. This activity became the basis for the charge of "plunder" at the war crimes trial of Krupp executives after the war.

As another war crime, Krupp used slave labor, both POWs and civilians from occupied countries, and Krupp representatives were sent to concentration camps to select laborers. Treatment of Slavic and Jewish slaves was particularly harsh, since they were considered sub-human in Nazi Germany, and Jews were targeted for "extermination through labor". The number of slaves cannot be calculated due to constant fluctuation but is estimated at 100,000, at a time when the free employees of Krupp numbered 278,000. The highest number of Jewish slave laborers at any one time was about 25,000 in January 1943.

In 1942–1943, Krupp built the Berthawerk factory (named for his mother), near the Markstadt forced labour camp, for production of artillery fuses. Jewish women were used as slave labor there, leased from the SS for 4 Marks a head per day. Later in 1943 it was taken over by Union Werke.

In 1942, although Russia in retreat relocated many factories to North Asia, steel factories were simply too large to move. Krupp took over production, including at the Molotov steel works near Kharkov and Kramatorsk in eastern Ukraine, and at mines supplying the iron, manganese, and chrome vital for steel production.

The battle of Stalingrad in 1942 convinced Krupp that Germany would lose the war, and he secretly began liquidating 200 million Marks in government bonds. This allowed him to retain much of his fortune and hide it overseas.

Beginning in 1943, Allied bombers targeted the main German industrial district in the Ruhr. Most damage at Krupp's works was actually to the slave labor camps, and German tank production continued to increase from 1,000 to 1,800 per month. However, by the end of the war, with a manpower shortage preventing repairs, the main factories were out of commission.

On 25 July 1943 the Royal Air Force attacked the Krupp Works with 627 heavy bombers, dropping 2,032 long tons of bombs in an Oboe-marked attack. Upon his arrival at the works the next morning, Gustav Krupp suffered a fit from which he never recovered.

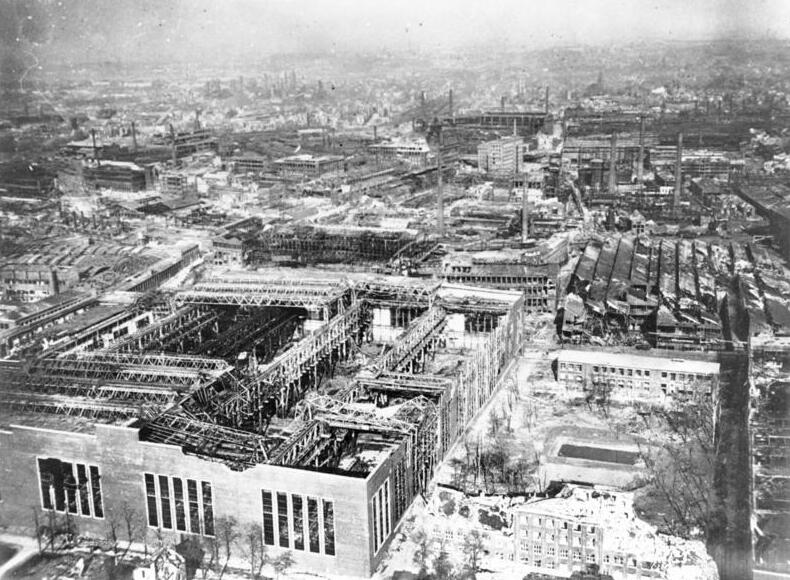
Devastation of Krupp factory, Essen, 1945

After the war, the Ruhr became part of the British Zone of occupation. The British dismantled Krupp's factories, sending machinery all over Europe as war reparations. The Russians seized Krupp's Grusonwerk in Magdeburg, including the formula for tungsten steel. Germaniawerft in Kiel was dismantled, and Krupp's role as an arms manufacturer came to an end. Allied High Commission Law 27, in 1950, mandated the decartelization of German industry.

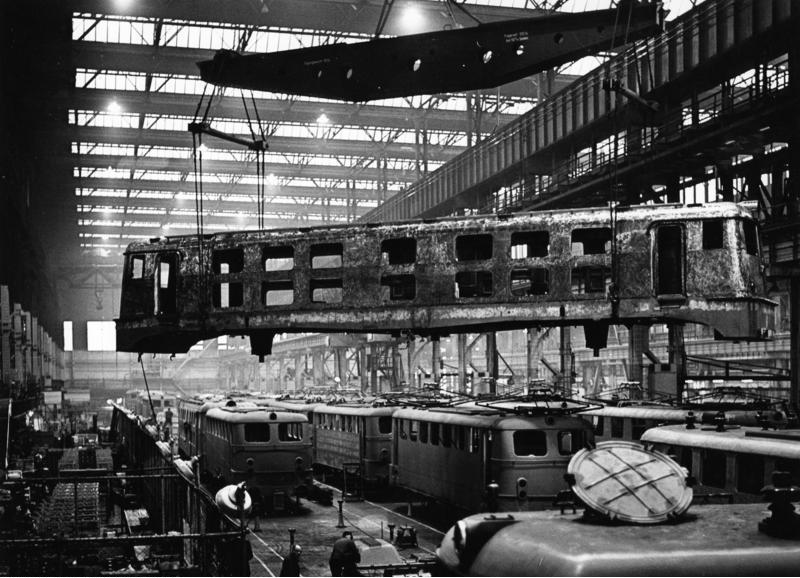
Electric locomotive construction at the Krupp Works, Essen, 1960

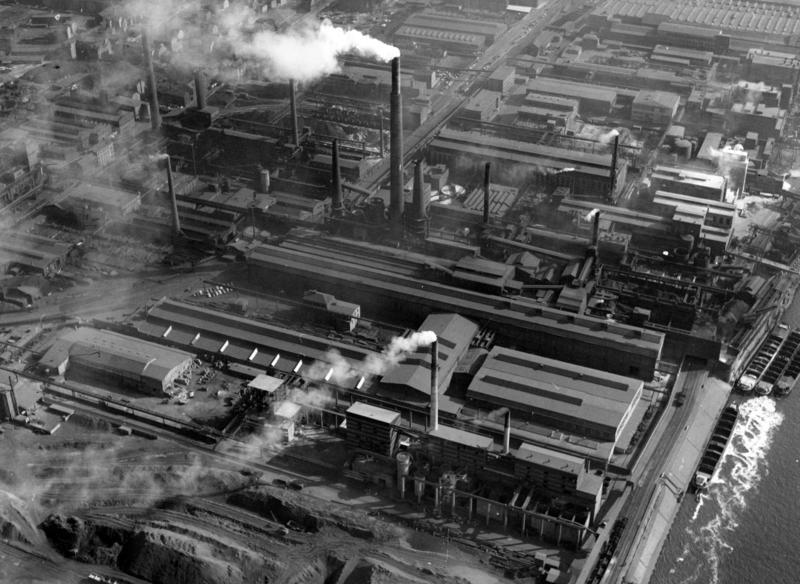
Krupp Works, Essen, 1961

Meanwhile, Alfried was held in Landsberg prison, where Hitler had been imprisoned in 1924. At the Krupp Trial, held in 1947–1948 in Nuremberg following the main Nuremberg trials, Alfried and most of his co-defendants were convicted of crimes against humanity (plunder and slave labor), while being acquitted of crimes against peace, and conspiracy. Alfried was condemned to 12 years in prison and the "forfeiture of all [his] property both real and personal," making him a pauper. Two years later, on 31 January 1951, John J. McCloy, High Commissioner of the American zone of occupation, issued an amnesty to the Krupp defendants. Much of Alfried's industrial empire was restored, but he was forced to transfer some of his fortune to his siblings, and he renounced arms manufacturing.

By this time, West Germany's Wirtschaftswunder had begun, and the Korean War had shifted the United States's priority from denazification to anti-Communism. German industry was seen as integral to western Europe's economic recovery, the limit on steel production was lifted, and the reputation of Hitler-era firms and industrialists was rehabilitated.

In 1953 Krupp negotiated the Mehlem agreement with the governments of the US, Great Britain and France. Hitler's Lex Krupp was upheld, reestablishing Alfried as sole proprietor, but Krupp mining and steel businesses were sequestered and pledged to be divested by 1959. There is scant evidence that Alfried intended to fulfill his side of the bargain, and he continued to receive royalties from the sequestered industries.

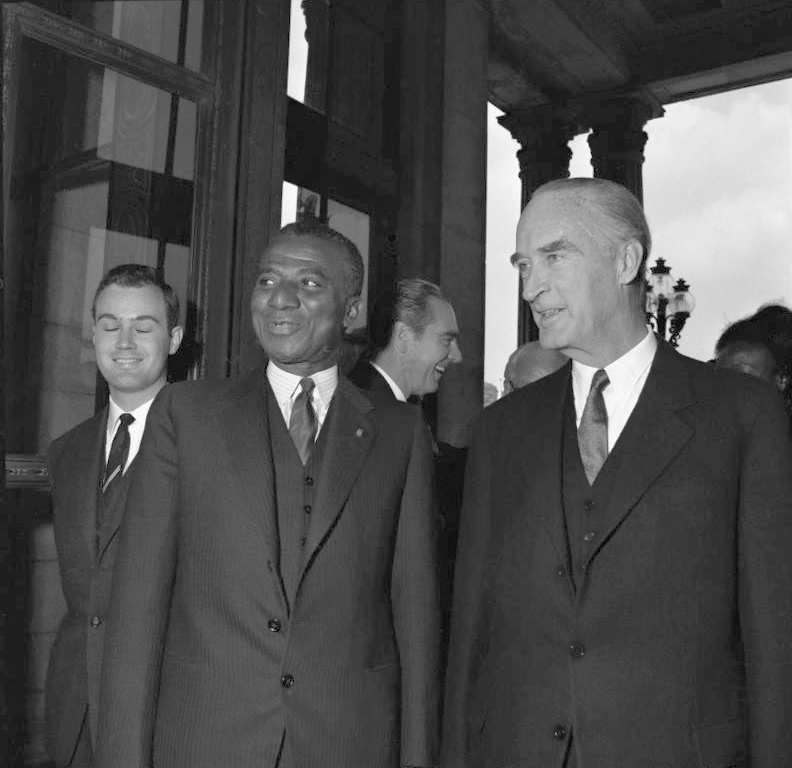
Alfried Krupp von Bohlen und Halbach (to the right), with Sylvanus Olympio the President of Togo, while visiting Villa Hügel on 17 May 1961

Despite having only 16,000 employees and 16,000 pensioners, Alfried refused to cut pensions. He ended unprofitable businesses including shipbuilding, railway tyres, and farm equipment. He hired Berthold Beitz, an insurance executive, as the face of the company, and began a public relations campaign to promote Krupp worldwide, omitting references to Nazism or arms manufacturing. Beginning with Adenauer, he established personal diplomacy with heads of state, making both open and secret deals to sell equipment and engineering expertise. Expansion was significant in the former colonies of Great Britain and behind the Iron Curtain, in countries eager to industrialize but suspicious of NATO. Krupp built rolling mills in Mexico, paper mills in Egypt, foundries in Iran, refineries in Greece, a vegetable oil processing plant in Sudan, and its own steel plant in Brazil. In India, Krupp rebuilt Rourkela in Odisha as company town similar to his own Essen. In West Germany, Krupp made jet fighters in Bremen, as a joint venture with United Aircraft, and built an atomic reactor in Jülich, partly funded by the government. The company expanded to 125,000 employees worldwide, and in 1959 Krupp was the fourth largest in Europe (after Royal Dutch, Unilever, and Mannesmann), and the 12th largest in the world.

1959 was also Krupp's deadline to sell his sequestered industries, but he was supported by other Ruhr industrialists, who refused to place bids. Krupp not only took back control of those companies in 1960, he used a shell company in Sweden to buy the Bochumer Verein für Gussstahlfabrikation AG, in his opinion the best remaining steel manufacturer in West Germany. The Common Market allowed these moves, effectively ending the Allied policy of decartelization. Alfried was the richest man in Europe, and among the world's handful of billionaires.

The treatment of Jews during the war had remained an issue. In 1951, Adenauer acknowledged that "unspeakable crimes were perpetrated in the name of the German people, which impose upon them the obligation to make moral and material amends." Negotiations with the Claims Conference resulted in the Reparations Agreement between Israel and West Germany. IG Farben, Siemens, Krupp, AEG, Telefunken, and Rheinmetall separately provided compensation to Jewish slave laborers, but Alfried refused to consider compensation to non-Jewish slave laborers.

In the mid-1960s, a series of blows ended the special status of Krupp. A recession in 1966 exposed the company's overextended credit and turned Alfried's cherished mining and steel companies into loss-leaders. In 1967, the West German Federal Tax Court ended sales tax exemptions for private companies, of which Krupp was the largest, and voided the Hitler-era exemption of the company from inheritance tax. Alfried's only son, Arndt von Bohlen und Halbach (1938–1986), would not develop an interest in the family business and was willing to renounce his inheritance. Alfried arranged for the firm to be reorganized as a corporation and a foundation for scientific research, with a generous pension for Arndt. Although Arndt was homosexual, like his great-grandfather Friedrich (Fritz) Krupp, he married but was childless. He was an alcoholic and died of cancer in 1986, aged 48, 399 years after Arndt Krupp arrived in Essen.

Alfried had married twice, both ending in divorce, and by family tradition he had excluded his siblings from company management. He died in Essen in 1967, and the company's transformation was completed the next year, capitalized at 500 million DM, with Beitz in charge of the Alfried Krupp von Bohlen und Halbach Foundation and chairman of the corporation's board until 1989. Between 1968 and 1990 the foundation awarded grants totaling around 360 million DM. In 1969, the coal mines were transferred to Ruhrkohle AG. Stahlwerke Südwestfalen was bought for stainless steel, and Polysius AG and Heinrich Koppers for engineering and the construction of industrial plants.

== Family tree ==
- Friedrich Krupp
  - Alfred Krupp
    - Friedrich Alfred Krupp
      - Bertha Krupp von Bohlen und Halbach
        - Alfried Krupp von Bohlen und Halbach
          - Arndt von Bohlen und Halbach
        - Claus von Bohlen und Halbach
        - Irmgard von Bohlen und Halbach Eilenstein
        - Berthold von Bohlen and Halbach
        - Harald Georg Wilhelm Wilken von Bohlen und Halbach
        - Waldtraut von Bohlen and Halbach
        - Eckbert Wolfgang Eberhard von Bohlen und Halbach
      - Barbara Krupp von Wilmowsky
    - Engelbertha Krupp Stroebele
      - Otto Wilhelm Stroebele
      - Adolph Theodore Stroebele
  - Hermann Friedrich Krupp
    - Arthur Krupp

== Sources ==
=== Books ===
•Manchester, William (2003) [1968], The Arms of Krupp: 1587–1968 (Paperback ed.), Boston, MA, US: Little, Brown and Company, ISBN 0-316-52940-0.

•Mason, Peter (1985), Blood and Iron (Paperback ed.), Penguin US, ISBN 0-14-007149-0.

•Tenfelde, Klaus, ed. (2005), Pictures of Krupp: Photography and History in the Industrial Age, London, UK and New York, NY, US: Philip Wilson Publishers, ISBN 978-0-85667-580-5.

=== Articles ===
•EC McCreary, "Social Welfare and Business: The Krupp Welfare Program, 1860–1914" (1968) 42(1) The Business History Review 24–49.
