= Arndt von Bohlen und Halbach =

German socialite (1938–1986)

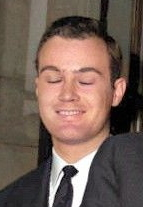
- von Bohlen und Halbach c. 1961
- Born: Arndt von Bohlen und Halbach; 24 January 1938; Berlin, Nazi Germany
- Died: 8 May 1986 (aged 48); München, West Germany
- Education: Stein Castle School; Lyceum Alpinum Zuoz
- Occupations: Industrial heir, socialite
- Spouse: Henriette von Auersperg (m. 1969)
- Father: Alfried Krupp von Bohlen und Halbach
- Family: Krupp family

Arndt von Bohlen und Halbach (24 January 1938 – 8 May 1986) was a German socialite and heir to the Krupp family. He was the only child of Alfried Krupp von Bohlen und Halbach and last heir to Krupp.

== Early life and education ==
Von Bohlen und Halbach was born 24 January 1938 in Charlottenburg, Berlin, Nazi Germany (presently Germany), the only child of Alfried Krupp von Bohlen und Halbach and Anneliese Krupp (née Bahr; formerly Lampert; 1909–1998). He was educated at two boarding schools in Bavaria at the Stein Castle School and later at Lyceum Alpinum Zuoz in Zuoz, Switzerland. He was raised Lutheran and was generally not accepted by his paternal family, especially by his grandmother Bertha Krupp.

== Life ==
He famously waived his inheritance in 1966 and thus was no longer the owner of the company Friedrich Krupp AG. Instead, his father created the Alfried Krupp von Bohlen und Halbach Foundation. However, Arndt agreed with receiving a yearly appanage of 2 million DM. Because he waived his inheritance, he was also not allowed to use the family name Krupp, which was reserved to the sole inheritor of the family business.

== Marriage and later life ==
Despite being homosexual like his great-grandfather Friedrich Alfred Krupp, on 14 February 1969, he married Princess Henriette von Auersperg, the daughter of Prince Alois von Auersperg (1897–1984) and his wife Countess Henriette Marie Louise Larisch von Moennich (1902–1994). The couple had no children.

Owing to generous compensation and appanage, Arndt was able to live a jet-set life, flying constantly between Miami and Marrakesh, Kitzbühel, Sylt and Munich. In 1982, he converted from Lutheran Protestantism to the Roman Catholic faith.

Like his great-grandfather, he died at the age of 48 in the Klinikum Großhadern in Munich of jaw cancer. He had been an alcoholic for a long time and was deeply in debt at the time of his death.

In his book LIFE, Keith Richards stated that Arndt was a regular party companion in Marrakesh.

== Literature ==
- Kammertöns, Hanns-Bruno (1998) Der letzte Krupp (in German). Hamburg: Hoffmann & Campe. ISBN 3-455-11188-2

== Media ==
- Bernard Baumgarten (choreographer): Pseudo-Krupp, ein Tanzstück. Date of premiere: 2 October 2001 at the Theatre d'Esch in Esch-sur-Alzette, Luxembourg.
- Luchino Visconti (director): The Damned, movie 1969, with Helmut Berger as "Martin von Essenbeck". His character is based on Arndt von Bohlen und Halbach. The screenplay was nominated for an Oscar in 1970.
- Carlo Rola (director): Krupp: A Family Between War and Peace. (German miniseries) Nikolai Kinski plays the young Arndt von Bohlen-Halbach.
