= Lex Krupp =

1943 Nazi German corporate reorganization law

Nazi Germany
- Long title: Decree converting Fried. Krupp AG into a family enterprise under sole ownership of Alfried Krupp von Bohlen und Halbach
- Enacted: 12 November 1943
- Signed: 12 November 1943
- Status: Repealed

The Lex Krupp, signed by Adolf Hitler on 12 November 1943, converted Fried. Krupp AG into a family enterprise to keep it under the Krupp family control. It transferred ownership from Bertha Krupp to her son Alfried Krupp von Bohlen und Halbach, dissolving the firm’s corporate structure and granting Alfried sole ownership and the right to use the Krupp name.

== History ==
Prior to this decree, Fried. Krupp AG (Aktiengesellschaft) was a public‐company style corporation, despite being almost wholly owned by Bertha Krupp von Bohlen und Halbach. Bertha had inherited the enterprise after the death of her father, Friedrich Alfred Krupp, in 1902; although she was the owner in name, operational control was largely exercised by her husband, Gustav Krupp von Bohlen und Halbach.

By 1943, Gustav Krupp was suffering serious health issues, including a stroke, and his capacity to run the firm's affairs was declining. Meanwhile, Alfried Krupp von Bohlen und Halbach, their eldest son, had been increasingly involved in the business, especially in armaments, raw materials, and mining sectors.

Under the Lex Krupp, the Fried. Krupp AG was converted from a stock corporation into a personally owned family enterprise with specially regulated succession rules. As a result, Bertha Krupp transferred ownership of the firm and its assets entirely to Alfried, bypassing the claims of any other potential heirs. Alfried was also authorized to prefix "Krupp" to his surname, becoming Alfried Krupp von Bohlen und Halbach, a change that was formally registered in June 1944.

The law became effective immediately. On 15 December 1943, the existing Aktiengesellschaft structure (Fried. Krupp AG) was dissolved in its last supervisory board meeting and replaced by an unincorporated company under Alfried’s sole ownership.
