= Helene Amalie Krupp =

German industrialist

Helene Amalie Krupp (1732–1812) was a German industrialist.

She was married to Friedrich Jodocus Krupp (1706–1757), owner of the Krupp merchant house, which she took over after his death. She traded in food, spices, textiles, cloth and porcelain between Germany, the Netherlands and Great Britain. She founded a snus factory and managed an iron works in the Ruhr in 1799-1807.

She has been referred to as the founder of the Krupp dynasty. Two mines and a street have been named after her.
