= Friedrich Krupp =

German steel manufacturer

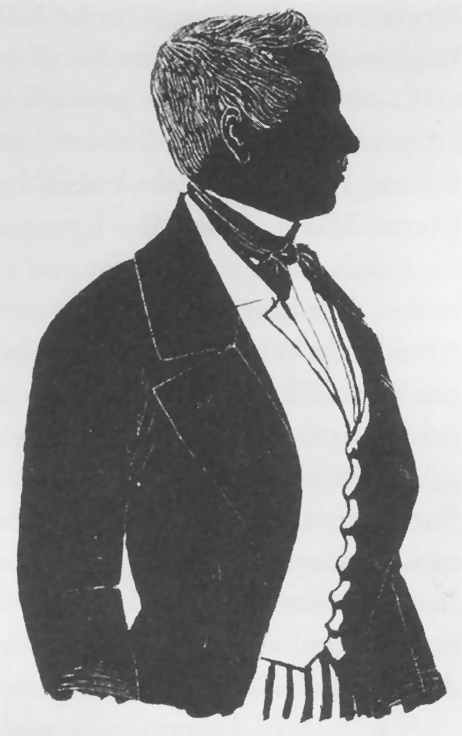
- A depiction of Krupp by an unknown sketch artist.
- Born: 17 July 1787; Prussia
- Died: 8 October 1826 (aged 39); Essen, Prussia, German Confederation
- Family: Krupp family

Friedrich Carl Krupp (17 July 1787 – Essen, 8 October 1826) was a German steel manufacturer and founder of the Krupp family commercial empire that is now subsumed into ThyssenKrupp.

== Biography ==
After the death of his father, he was brought up by his grandmother Helene Amalie Krupp, who had, in 1800, purchased the Sterkrade Works. Here Friedrich endeavored to make cast steel, the secret of which was carefully guarded in England.

With Gottlob Jacobs, an engineer, Krupp made his first experiments at the Sterkrade Works, and after the sale of the plant in 1808 continued his attempts independently at Essen. In 1810 he founded a small forging plant near Essen, and in 1815 formed a partnership with Friedrich Nicolai for the production of cast steel, a product which was found excellent for certain purposes, such as mint dies, stamps for buttons, etc.

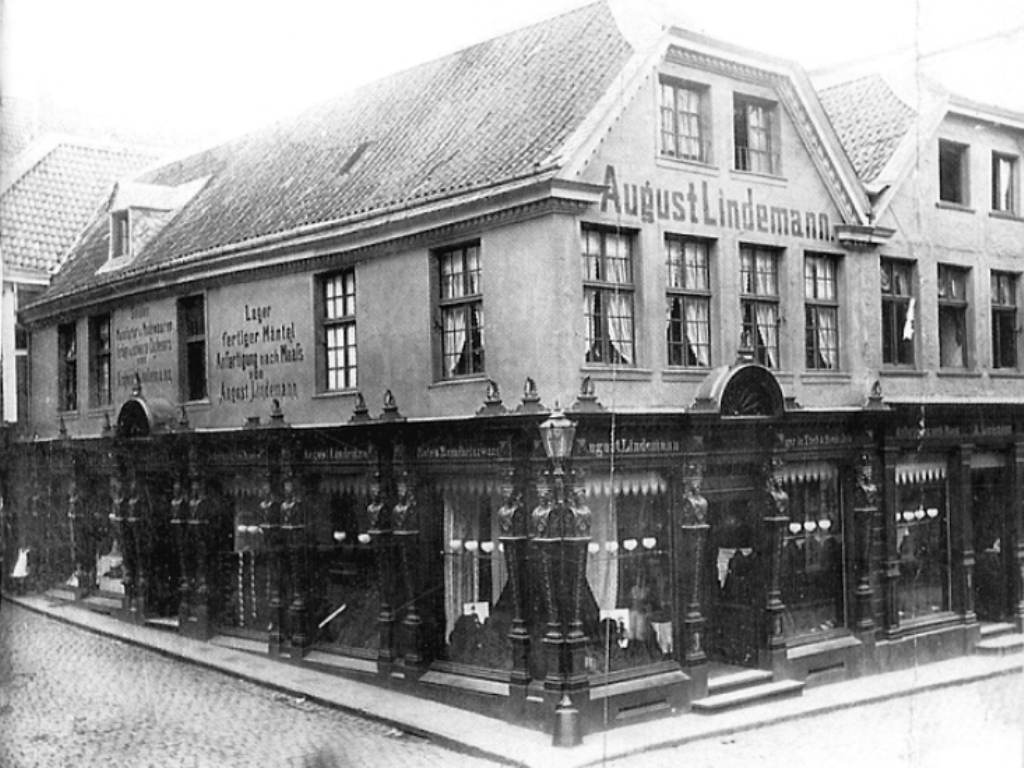
Birthhouse of Friedrich Krupp and his son Alfred Krupp in Essen, around 1850–1880

Yet the demand was not sufficient to keep the works in operation, and soon after 1820 Krupp was obliged to give up his house to occupy a small one-story laborer's cottage near his plant. The hut was long preserved in the midst of the gigantic Krupp works. After his death, the business was taken over by his widow Therese Krupp. Shortly before his death, he confided to his son Alfred the secret of making cast steel, which the latter developed successfully.
