= Bertha Krupp =

Industrial dynasty matriarch (1886–1957)

Bertha Krupp von Bohlen und Halbach
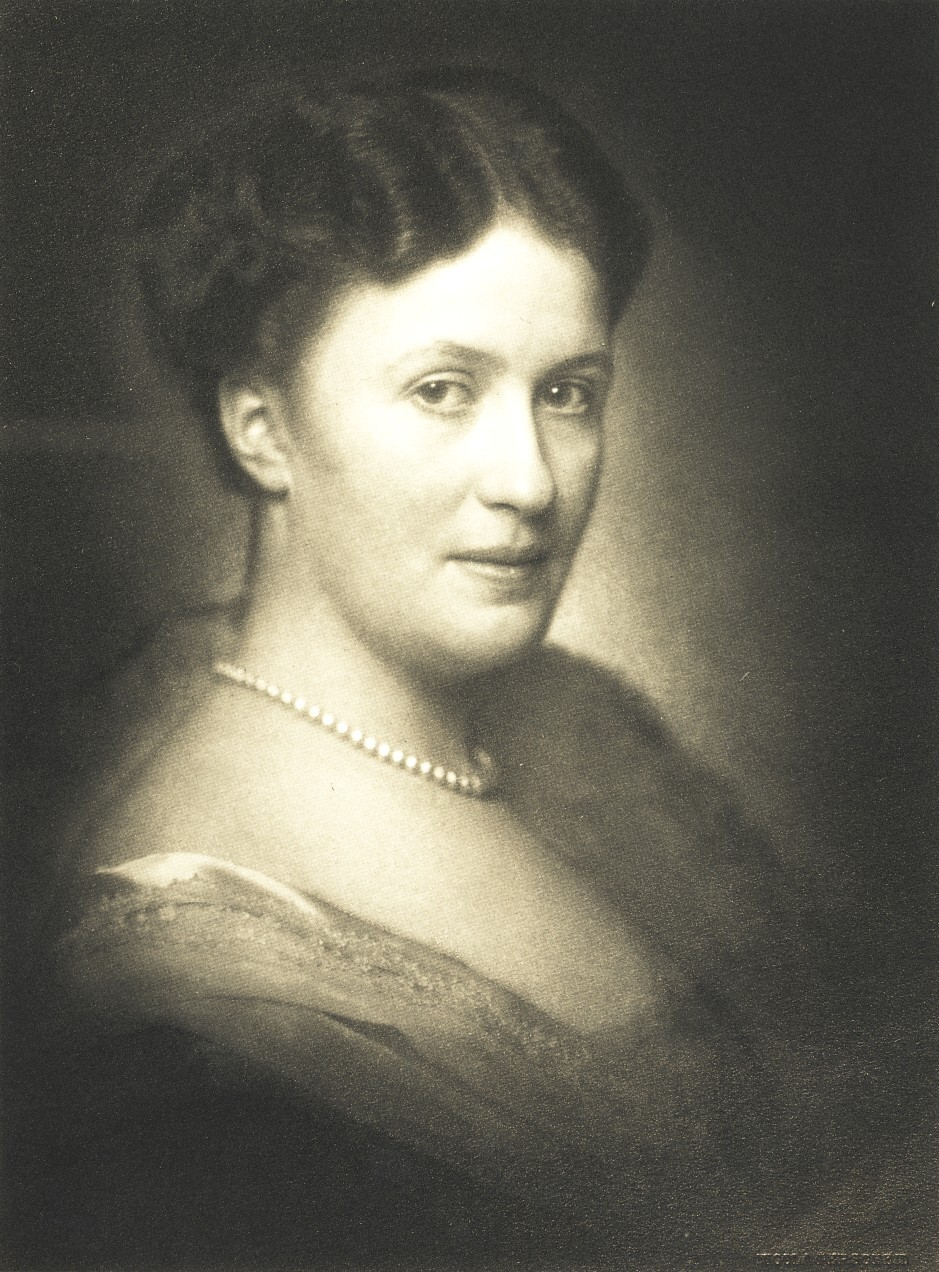
- Photo of Bertha von Bohlen und Halbach by Nicola Perscheid
- Born: Bertha Krupp; 29 March 1886; Essen, Rhine Province, Kingdom of Prussia, German Empire
- Died: 21 September 1957 (aged 71); Essen, North Rhine-Westphalia, West Germany
- Spouse: Gustav Krupp von Bohlen und Halbach (m. 1907)
- Children: 8
- Parent(s): Friedrich Alfred Krupp (1854–1902); Baroness Margrethe von Ende

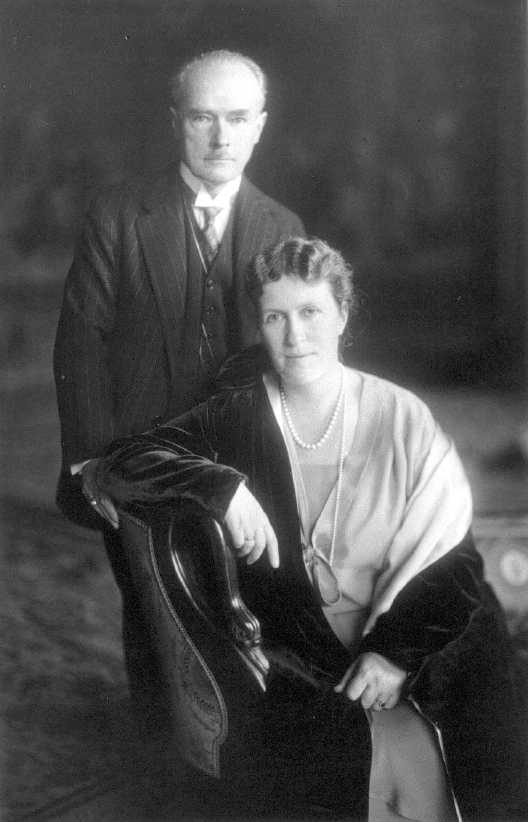
Bertha with Gustav Krupp von Bohlen und Halbach, 1927

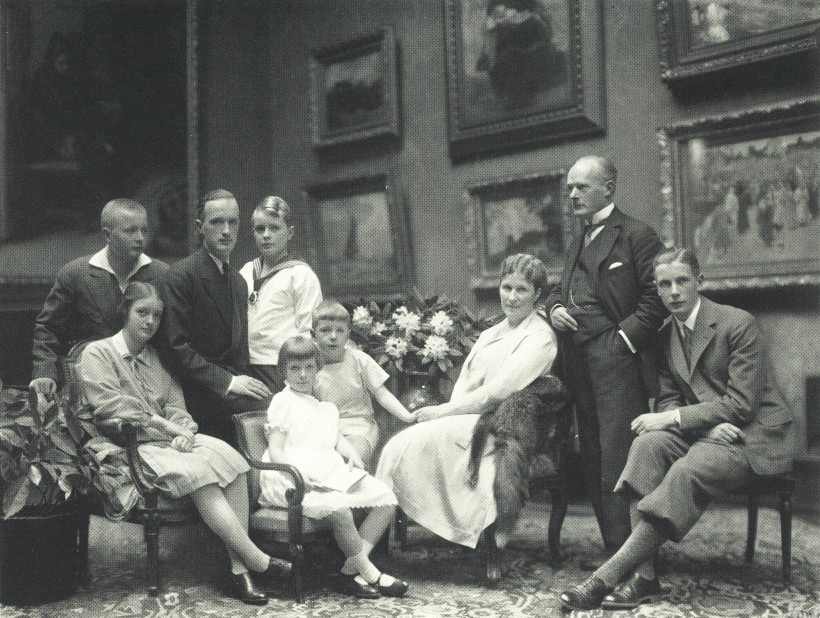
Bertha with family, 1928, by Nicola Perscheid

Bertha Krupp von Bohlen und Halbach (born Bertha Krupp; 29 March 1886 – 21 September 1957) was a member of the Krupp family, Germany's leading industrial dynasty of the 19th and 20th centuries. As the elder child and heir of Friedrich Alfred Krupp she was the sole proprietor of the Krupp industrial empire from 1902 to 1943, although her husband, Gustav Krupp von Bohlen und Halbach, ran the company in her name. In 1943 ownership of the company was transferred to her son Alfried.

== Biography ==
Bertha Krupp was born in Essen, home of the Krupp family and their company since the 16th century. Her mother was Margrethe Freiin von Ende (1854–1931), the daughter of Karl Ludwig August, Freiherr von Ende (1815–1889) and his wife, Countess Eleonore von Königsdorff (1831–1907). At the time of Bertha's birth the company was owned and managed by her grandfather Alfred. Upon his death the following year, her father Friedrich inherited ownership and control. After the birth of her sister Barbara (1887–1972), the future of the company with an absence of a male heir was in doubt.

Friedrich Krupp died in 1902, leaving Bertha as the heiress to the Krupp interests. However, it was considered unsuitable for a woman to exercise control over the vast Krupp coal, steel and state-connected armaments empire. Kaiser Wilhelm II personally led a search for a suitable husband for Bertha and successfully proposed Gustav von Bohlen und Halbach, a professional diplomat of good family and a familiar figure at the Kaiser's court. They were married on October 15, 1906 and Bertha became sole owner of the company with Gustav adding the name Krupp to his surname and assuming executive control of the company. Barbara received a large cash settlement in lieu.

Gustav and Bertha had eight children: Alfried (1907–1967), Arnold (1908-1909), Claus (1910–1940), Irmgard (1912–1998), Berthold (1913–1987), Harald (1916–1985), Waldtraut (1920–2005) and Eckbert (1922–1945). Of these only Alfried as the eldest son took the surname Krupp von Bohlen und Halbach. The others used the surname von Bohlen und Halbach. Claus and Eckbert were killed on active service in World War II, and Harald spent ten years in captivity in the Soviet Union.

During World War I, the Krupp company manufactured large mortars that the German army used to bombard forts in Belgium and France. German troops nicknamed these Dicke Bertha ("Big Bertha") after Bertha Krupp von Bohlen und Halbach. Allied troops used the translated name, "Big Bertha," to refer to all German long-range artillery, particularly those that shelled Paris in 1918. However, "Big Bertha" entered the lexicon due to the Paris Gun, a piece of German artillery which was constructed of three artillery barrels welded together. It had a range of 75 miles and its appearance was a major surprise to Parisians in 1917 who had previously only come under attack from German aircraft, since previous artillery reached a maximum of thirty miles.

Unlike her husband, who became an ardent supporter of Adolf Hitler and the Nazis, Bertha Krupp never liked Hitler even though she never complained when the company's bottom line rose through the armaments contracts and production. She referred to him as "that certain gentleman" (Dieser gewisse Herr) and pleaded illness when Hitler came on an official tour in 1934. Irmgard acted as hostess in her stead.

After Gustav Krupp von Bohlen und Halbach suffered a stroke in 1941, his health declined sharply. In 1943 Hitler issued a decree known as the Lex Krupp, which passed full ownership of the Krupp empire—which was vital to Germany's war effort—from Bertha to her son Alfried, who then assumed control of the company. Bertha took Gustav to a family estate in Tyrol, where they remained until the end of the war.

In 1945 Gustav was indicted as a war criminal, but was declared medically unfit to stand trial. He died in 1950. Alfried Krupp von Bohlen und Halbach was indicted on charges of crimes against humanity in relation to the Krupp company's use and mistreatment of concentration camp inmates as slave labour in Krupp factories—particularly at the Berthawerk, a factory near the Markstadt forced labour camp, which was named after Bertha. He was sentenced to twelve years in prison and the confiscation of all his property. He served five years in prison before being freed in 1951 when the US High Commissioner in Germany, John J. McCloy, granted clemency, after deciding that there was no danger of a Nazi revival.

In 1951 Bertha Krupp returned with Alfried to Essen, where Alfried resumed control of the company and rapidly restored it to a dominant position in the German economy, (although it no longer made armaments). She had become a much-loved figure in the city, known for her charitable work and her frequent visits to injured or ill Krupp workers and their families.

Bertha Krupp von Bohlen und Halbach died in Essen on 21 September 1957. She was buried in the family crypt outside the city.

== Legacy ==
By the time of Bertha's death she had 5 living children, and many grandchildren, but only Alfried and his only child Arndt had the right to use the Krupp surname. Arndt (1938–1986) had, in 1966, refused to take his family's inheritance, so he lost the right to the Krupp surname. Because of that, with the death of Bertha in 1957 and, later, with the death of her son Alfried in 1967, the Krupp surname became extinct. Any members of the family with the Krupp name are cousins whose common ancestor dates back to the early 19th century or earlier.
