= Therese Krupp =

German industrialist

Therese Krupp (1790–1850), born Therese Johanne Helene Wilhelmi, was a German industrialist. She was married to Friedrich Krupp and took over the Krupp company after his death in 1826.
