= Alfred Krupp =

German entrepreneur and inventor (b. 1812, d. 1887)

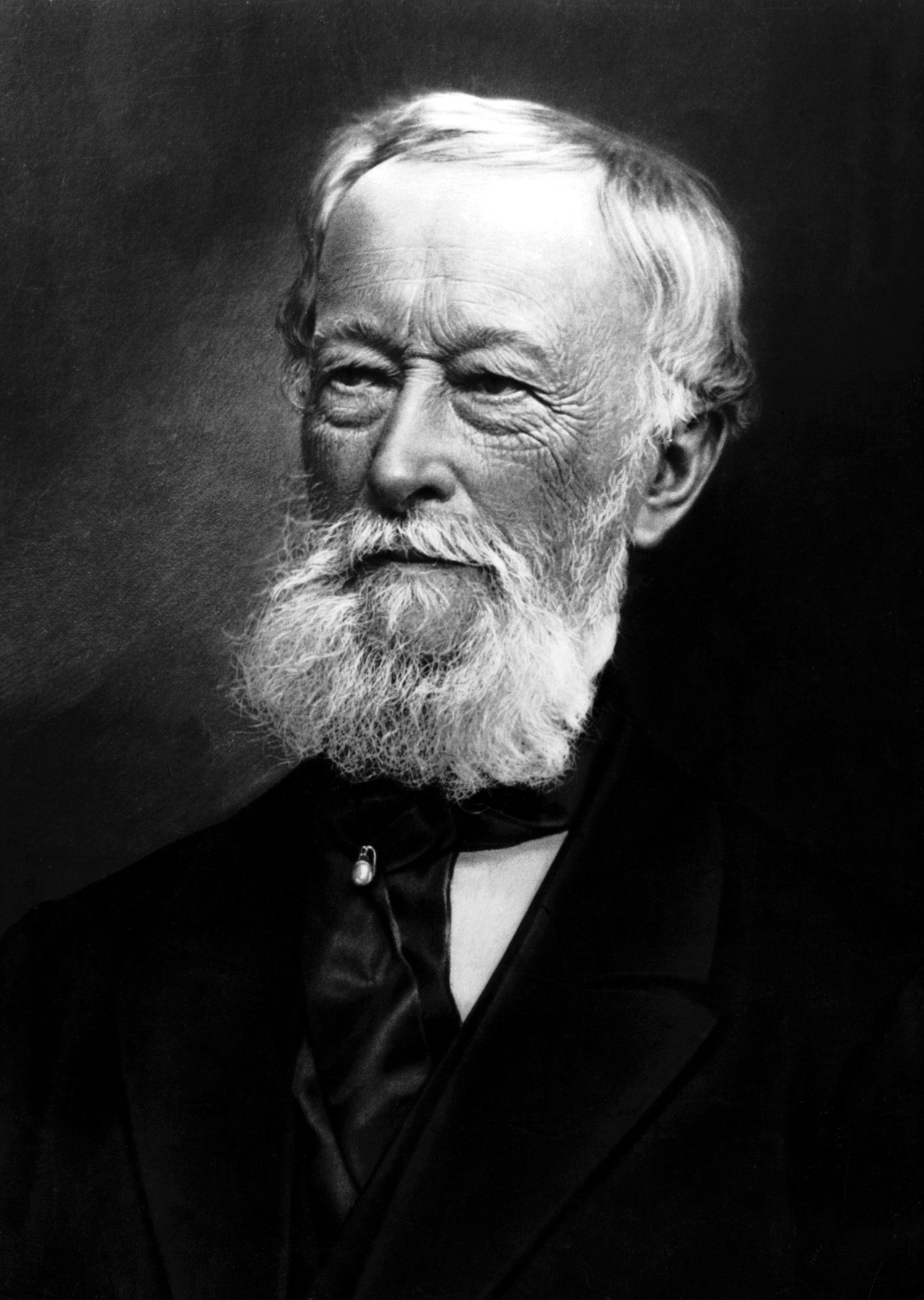
- Born: 26 April 1812
- Died: 14 July 1887 (aged 75)
- Other name: The Cannon King
- Organization: Krupp company
- Known for: Innovations in steel and manufacturing of arms

Alfred Krupp (born Alfried Felix Alwyn Krupp; 26 April 1812 – 14 July 1887) was a German steel manufacturer and inventor, and also the largest arms supplier of his era, which earned him the nickname "The Cannon King". He was the head of the Krupp company, known today as ThyssenKrupp.

== Biography ==
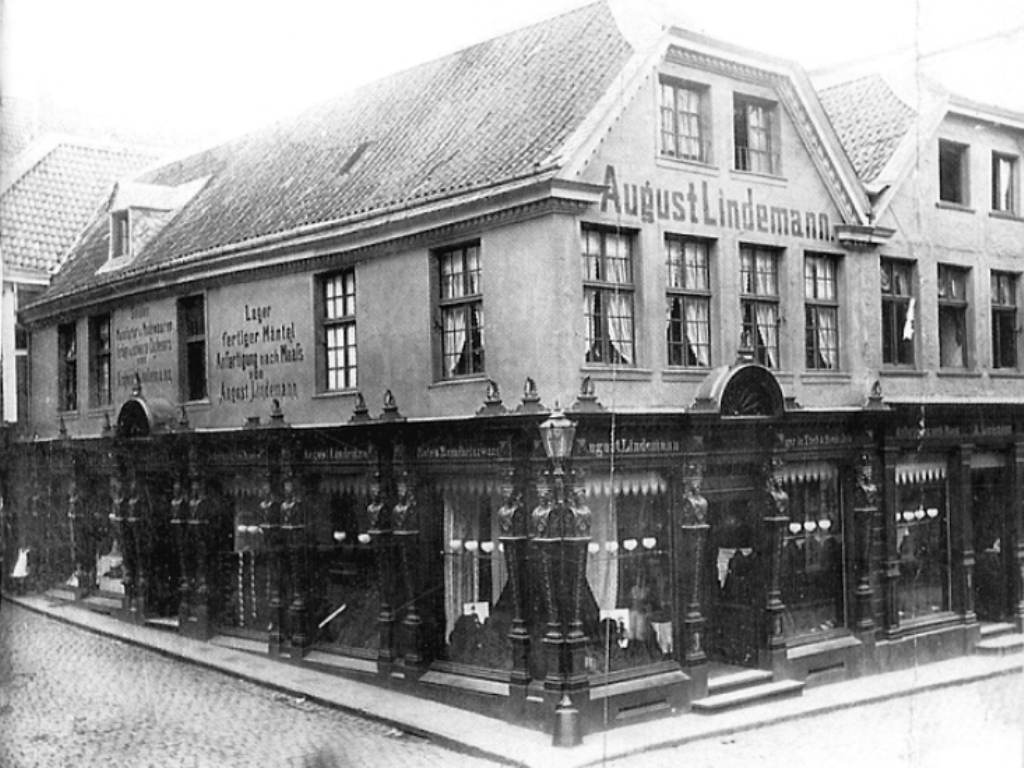
Birthhouse of Alfred Krupp and his father Friedrich Krupp in Essen, around 1850–1880

=== Early life ===
Alfred Krupp, son of Friedrich Krupp and his wife Therese Johanne Helene Wilhelmi (1790-1850), was born in 1812. His father did not manage to put the factory he founded in 1811 on its feet during his lifetime. He died in 1826 when Alfred Krupp was 14 years old and left to his son the secret of making high-quality cast steel, together with a small workshop in which production had come almost to a standstill. At this time, the family lived with the aunt in Metternich. The company, at that time had only seven jobs and a debt of 10,000 thalers, was inherited by Friedrich's wife Theresa.

=== The Krupp company ===
Together with Friedrich Krupp's sister, Helena von Müller, née Krupp, a steel company was founded. The founding agreement was signed by all the heirs of Friedrich and his sister Helena. Alfred dropped out of school and took over the firm, although the firm was officially owned by his mother. By 1830 the situation had changed. With the development of rail transport in Germany and Europe, the demand for steel for the production of rails and steam locomotive axles had greatly increased. On 26 August 1830, after overcoming some difficulties in steel production, Krupp supplies cast steel rolls for the first time to Hüseken in Hagen-Hohenlimburg.

The creation of the German Customs Union facilitated freight transport in Germany. In 1836, Krupp already employed 60 people. Alfred Krupp took care of his "Kruppians", as they were later called, all his life. He introduced sickness insurance and built apartments for workers. In exchange, he demanded loyalty from them to the firm.

=== 1850s ===
Alfred Krupp won new customers, extended his firm's purchases of raw materials, and secured funds to finance the expansion of his works. At the first world exhibition, the Great Exhibition, in London in 1851, he exhibited the largest steel ingot ever cast up to that time (4,300 pounds).

In 1851, another successful innovation, no-weld railway tyres, began the company's primary revenue stream, from sales to railways in the United States. Alfred enlarged the factory and fulfilled his long-cherished scheme to construct a breech-loading cannon of cast steel. He strongly believed in the superiority of breech-loaders, on account of improved accuracy and speed, but this view did not win general acceptance among military officers, who remained loyal to tried-and-true muzzle-loaded bronze cannons. Alfred soon began producing breech loading howitzers, one of which he gave to the Prussian court.

In 1851, he also patented a seamless rail wheel called the Radreifen.

Indeed, unable to sell his steel cannon, Krupp gave it to the King of Prussia, who used it as a decorative piece. The king's brother Wilhelm, however, realized the significance of the innovation. After he became regent in 1859, Prussia bought its first 312 steel cannon from Krupp, which became the main arms manufacturer for the Prussian military.

Prussia used the advanced technology of Krupp to defeat both Austria and France in the German Wars of Unification. The French high command refused to purchase Krupp guns despite Napoleon III's support. The Franco-Prussian war was in part a contest of "Kruppstahl" versus bronze cannon. The success of German artillery spurred the first international arms race, against Schneider-Creusot in France and Armstrong in England. Krupp was able to sell, alternately, improved artillery and improved steel shielding to countries from Russia to Chile to Siam.

In the Panic of 1873, Alfred continued to expand, including the purchase of Spanish mines and Dutch shipping, making Krupp the biggest and richest company in Europe but nearly bankrupting it. He was bailed out with a 30 million Mark loan from a consortium of banks arranged by the Prussian State Bank.

In 1878 and 1879 Krupp held competitions known as Völkerschiessen, which were firing demonstrations of cannon for international buyers. These were held in Meppen, at the largest proving ground in the world; privately owned by Krupp. He took on 46 nations as customers. At the time of his death in 1887, he had 75,000 employees, including 20,200 in Essen. In his lifetime, Krupp manufactured a total of 24,576 guns; 10,666 for the German government and 13,910 for export.

=== Krupp's influence on Germany and Essen ===
Krupp established the Generalregulativ as the firm's basic constitution. The company was a sole proprietorship, inherited by primogeniture, with strict control of workers. Krupp demanded a loyalty oath, required workers to obtain written permission from their foremen when they needed to use the toilet and issued proclamations telling his workers not to concern themselves with national politics. In return, Krupp provided social services that were unusually liberal for the era, including "colonies" with parks, schools and recreation grounds - while the widows' and orphans' and other benefit schemes insured the men and their families in case of illness or death. Essen became a large company town and Krupp became a de facto state within a state, with "Kruppianer" as loyal to the company and the Krupp family as to the nation and the Hohenzollern family. Krupp's paternalist strategy was adopted by Bismarck as government policy, as a preventive against Social Democratic tendencies, and later influenced the development and adoption of Führerprinzip by Adolf Hitler.

=== Krupp social service ===
The Krupp social services program began about 1861, when it was found that there were not sufficient houses in the town for firm employees, and the firm began building dwellings. By 1862 ten houses were ready for foremen, and in 1863 the first houses for workingmen were built in Alt Westend. Neu Westend was built in 1871 and 1872. By 1905, 400 houses were provided, many being given rent free to widows of former workers. A cooperative society was founded in 1868 which became the Consum-Anstalt. Profits were divided according to amounts purchased. A boarding house for single men, the Ménage, was started in 1865 with 200 boarders and by 1905 accommodated 1000. Bath houses were provided and employees received free medical services. Accident, life, and sickness insurance societies were formed, and the firm contributed to their support. Technical and manual training schools were provided.

== Krupp and the Kaiser ==
Krupp was also held in high esteem by the Kaiser, who dismissed Julius von Verdy du Vernois and his successor Hans von Kaltenborn for rejecting Krupp's design of the C-96 field gun, quipping, "I’ve canned three War Ministers because of Krupp, and still they don’t catch on!"

== Krupp's views ==
Krupp proclaimed he wished to have "a man come and start a counter-revolution" against Jews, socialists and liberals. In some of his odder moods, he considered taking the role himself. According to historian William Manchester, his great grandson, Krupp would interpret these outbursts as a prophecy fulfilled by the coming of Hitler.

== Personal life ==
Krupp's marriage was not a happy one. His wife Bertha (not to be confused with their granddaughter), was unwilling to remain in polluted Essen in Villa Hügel, the mansion which Krupp designed. She spent most of their married years in resorts and spas, with their only child, a son.

He was a tireless worker who never rested on his laurels, and an extreme hypochondriac who suffered from depression and did not leave his bed for weeks and months.

Krupp developed marked eccentricities later in life, such as a belief that the smell of horse manure nurtured the imagination. Upon completion of Villa Hügel, Krupp located his own room immediately above the stables and bored a tube through the ceiling to allow the smell to filter in.

Despite owning the mansion, Krupp continued to make use of the small house built by his father at the factory in Essen, known as the Stammhaus Krupp. It was here that Alfred Krupp kept weighing scales in the form of a chair, where he had visitors sit on the chair and would record their weight. The first entry in the ledger was made in 1866 and the final was in 1899, showing that the tradition had been continued after Krupp's death.

He envisioned the employer as a patriarch, demanding from his workers not only respect, but also obedience and providing them with a secure existence for this. He thought highly of himself as an entrepreneur. In his Villa Hügel, he received the leaders from across Europe. Kings and emperors came to visit him not for receptions, but as clients. Therefore, in 1865, he refused the title of nobility granted to him by the King of Prussia as "inappropriate to his wishes." His name was Krupp, and that was enough.

== Notes ==
- Alfred Krupp in Britannica.
