= Friedrich Alfred Krupp =

German steel manufacturer (1854–1902)

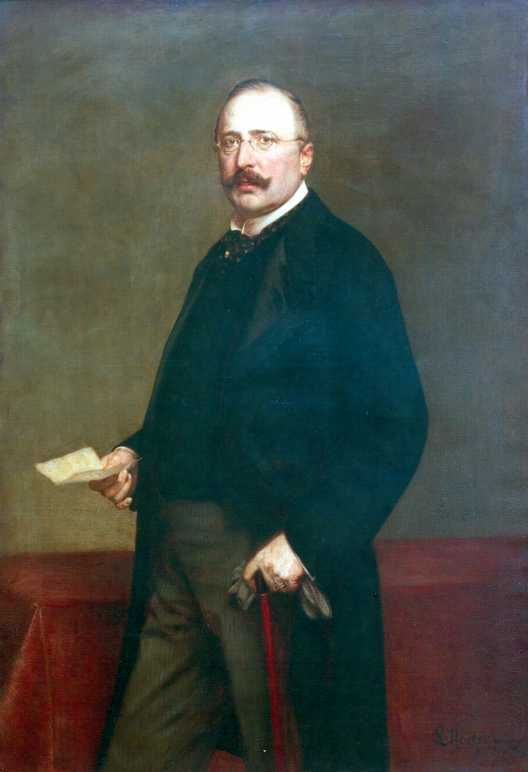
- F. A. Krupp in 1896 by Ludwig Noster

Member of the Reichstag
- In office 1893–1898

Personal details
- Born: Friedrich Alfred Krupp; February 17, 1854 Essen, Rhine Province, Kingdom of Prussia
- Died: November 22, 1902 (aged 48) Essen, Rhine Province, German Empire
- Party: Free Conservative Party
- Spouse: Margarethe von Ende (m. 1882; died 1902)
- Children: 2, including Bertha
- Parents: Alfred Krupp; Bertha Eichhoff
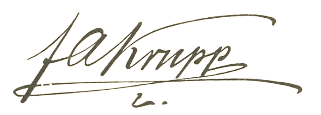
- Signature

Friedrich Alfred Krupp (/krʊpp/; 17 February 1854 – 22 November 1902) was a German steel manufacturer and head of the company Krupp. He was the son of Alfred Krupp and inherited the family business when his father died in 1887. Whereas his father had largely supplied iron and steel, Friedrich shifted his company's production back to arms manufacturing. Friedrich greatly expanded Krupp and acquired the Germaniawerft in 1896 which gave him control of warship manufacturing in Germany. He oversaw the development of nickel steel, U-boats, the diesel engine, and much more. He died in 1902, possibly by suicide, after being accused of homosexuality. His daughter Bertha inherited the company.

== Early life and education ==
Krupp was born in Essen, Germany. His father was Alfred Krupp, who turned the small local ironworks of Krupp into one of the most powerful companies in the world. Raised in the unhealthy atmosphere of the Ruhr, he suffered from asthma and was more interested in natural sciences than business, so his father even considered passing the company to one of his own nephews.

== Career ==
However in 1887, Friedrich took over the leadership of his late father's company. He married Baroness Margarethe von Ende (1854-1931). They had two daughters: Bertha and Barbara (married Tilo, Baron von Wilmowsky).

Whereas his father had largely supplied iron and steel for railroads in America, with the rise of Carnegie Steel, Friedrich shifted his company's production back to arms manufacturing. During his time in charge, he greatly expanded Krupp, acquiring Germaniawerft in 1896 which gave him control of warship manufacturing in Germany. He oversaw the development of nickel steel, U-boats, the diesel engine, and much more. Krupp increased and diversified the output of the Krupp Works, which he extended by the incorporation with them of other enterprises. A member of the House of Lords of Prussia and Council of State, he also sat in Germany's Reichstag from 1893 to 1898.

== Personal life ==
For four years, beginning in 1898, Krupp spent several months of the year on the Italian island of Capri, staying at the hotel Quisisana. He kept two yachts there, Maya and Puritan. His hobby was oceanography. He met Felix Anton Dohrn and Ignazio Cerio on Capri.

In 1902 he died, apparently by suicide. His daughter Bertha inherited the company and shortly thereafter married Gustav Halbach, the grandson of Henry Bohlen.

=== Scandal and death ===
In the 1890s, the owner of a luxurious hotel in Berlin discovered that Krupp was meeting with young Italian male lovers; homosexuality was criminalized in Germany, but Krupp's ally, Kaiser Wilhelm II, prevented any development of a controversy, at least domestically. However, the Kaiser was unable to influence events in Italy.

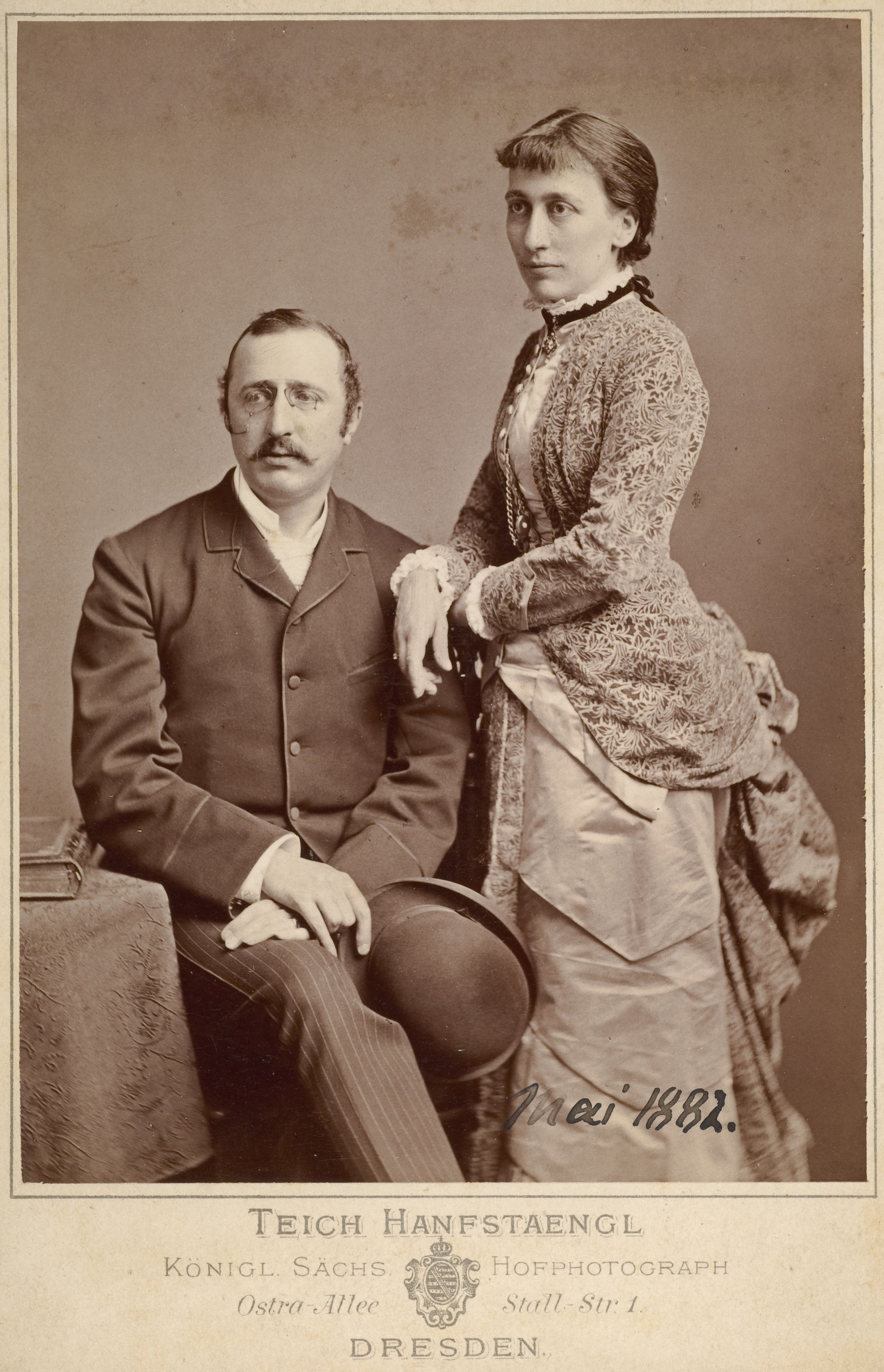
Wedding of F. A. Krupp and Margarethe von Ende, 1882

On 15 November 1902, the Social Democratic magazine Vorwärts claimed that Friedrich Alfred Krupp was homosexual, that he had a number of liaisons with boys and men on Capri, and that his closest attachment was to Adolfo Schiano, an 18-year-old barber and amateur musician. This report appeared in the German press months after stories of an unnamed foreign businessman's homosexual orgies were printed in local and Neapolitan papers demanding an inquest. Capri locals were aware of Krupp's homosexual activities, but those in positions of power turned a blind eye, including the owner of Quisisana, who had a certain influence over a local political party, to which Krupp contributed funds. The Neopolitan paper Il Mattino was the first to publish an article, while withholding Krupp's name. Its source in Capri was a teacher who resented Krupp's choice of a different Italian language instructor. This teacher had also been heavily criticized by the same political party that had the support and patronage of Krupp, causing the teacher to support the opposing political party.

Krupp returned to Germany, waiting for the scandal to pass. Instead, Italian newspapers continued to identify a wealthy foreign capitalist as the center of homosexual activity. The first report in Germany appeared in the Catholic newspaper Augsburger Postzeitung in August 1902. It cited reports in two Italian newspapers and like them described but did not name the industrialist.

In October 1902, Krupp's wife Margarethe von Ende received anonymous letters and, according to some reports, compromising photos of her husband's orgies. She asked Kaiser Wilhelm II, a Krupp family friend, to take action against her husband, but he refused to listen. Krupp himself then had his wife committed to an insane asylum.

The newspaper Vorwärts then published their article titled "Krupp in Capri", stating: "If Krupp continues to live in Germany, he will be subject to penalties under Paragraph 175 of the Code. When certain illegal practices lead to a public scandal, the police have a duty to promote legal action." Under Paragraph 175, homosexual acts were punishable by years of hard labor.

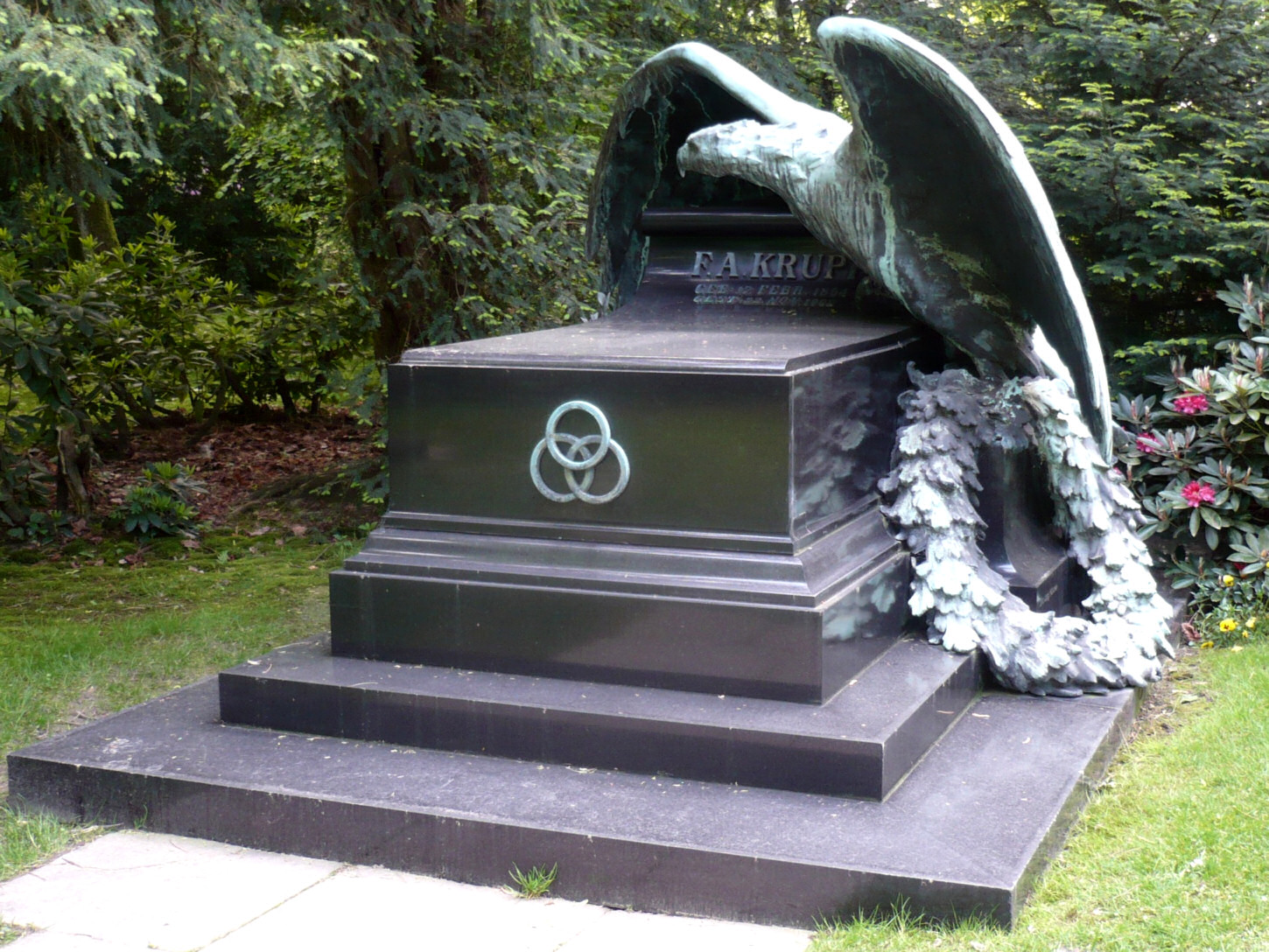
Grave of F. A. Krupp

Krupp sued the newspaper and sought help from his allies in government, including Kaiser Wilhelm. Copies of Vorwärts were seized and destroyed, even in the homes of subscribers. It seemed that Krupp had decided to give battle. However, by now his nerves were shot, perhaps because of the suspicion that this time the scandal was so big and well-grounded that even his wealth and his friendships could not save him if due process occurred.

A week after Vorwärts published the allegations against Krupp, on 22 November 1902, Krupp died. It is uncertain whether he died by suicide or illness.

In a speech at Krupp's burial, Kaiser Wilhelm attacked the Social Democratic politicians, insisting that they had lied about Krupp's sexual orientation. Krupp's heirs initiated a lawsuit against Vorwärts, but soon abandoned the action.

== Bibliography ==
- A. Sper, Capri und die Homosexuellen: Eine psychologische Studie, Orania Verlag, Berlin s.d. ma 1903.
- Guido Podrecca, La tavola rotonda in Germania, Mantegazza, Roma 1919, pp. 102–109.
- Norman Douglas, Looking Back: An Autobiographical Excursion, Harcourt, Brace and Company, New York 1933. Chapter about Dottor Salvatore Lo Bianco.
- Roger Peyrefitte, Les amours singulières, Paris 1949; L' exilé de Capri, Flammarion, Paris 1959.
- Edwin Cerio: Capri. Ein kleines Welttheater im Mittelmeer, München, 1954, pages 135-143.
- Willi Boelcke, Krupp und die Hohenzollern in Dokumenten, 1850–1918, Athenaion, Frankfurt 1970, pp. 158–162.
- William Manchester, The Arms of Krupp, 1587–1968, Little & Brown, Boston 1968.
- Humbert Kesel, Capri. Biographie einer Insel. Prestel Verlag, München 1971, pp. 264–268, ISBN 3-7913-0007-5.
- Angelo Cerino, I Krupp e la guerra come industria, Cremonese, Roma 1974, pp. 59–61.
- James Money, Capri. La storia e i suoi protagonisti [1986], Rusconi, Milano 1993, pp. 82–85, 91-96, 240-241.
- Carlo Knight, Krupp a Capri. Uno scandalo d'altri tempi (e uno dei nostri), Civita, Napoli 1989.
- Tito Fiorani, Le dimore del mito, La Conchiglia, Capri 1996, pp. 99–106.
- Carlo Knight: Die Capri-Utopie von Krupp - L'utopia caprese di Krupp. 2002, Capri, La Conchiglia Edizioni.
- Enrico Oliari, L'omo delinquente. Scandali e delitti gay dall'Unità a Giolitti, Prospettiva editrice, Roma 2006.
- Michael Epkenhans, Ralf Stremmel (Hrsg.): Friedrich Alfred Krupp. Ein Unternehmer im Kaiserreich. Beck, München 2010, ISBN 978-3-406-60670-0.
- Gilman, D. C.; Peck, H. T.; Colby, F. M., eds. (1905). "Krupp, Friedrich Alfred" . New International Encyclopedia (1st ed.). New York: Dodd, Mead.
- Winzen, Peter (2011). "Der erste politische Homosexualitätsskandal im Kaiserreich: Friedrich Alfred Krupp (1854–1902)". Archiv für Kulturgeschichte. 93 (2): 415–450. doi:10.7788/akg.2011.93.2.415. ISSN 0003-9233. S2CID 180272192.
