= Krupp =

German steel and weapons production company

Friedrich Krupp AG Hoesch-Krupp
- Formerly: Fried. Krupp AG (1903–1968, 1992); Friedrich Krupp GmbH (1968–1991)
- Type: Public
- Industry: Conglomerate
- Predecessor: Hoesch AG
- Founded: 1811; 215 years ago in Essen, Germany
- Founder: Friedrich Krupp
- Defunct: 1999; 27 years ago
- Fate: Merged with Thyssen to form ThyssenKrupp
- Area served: Worldwide
- Owner: Alfried Krupp von Bohlen und Halbach Foundation

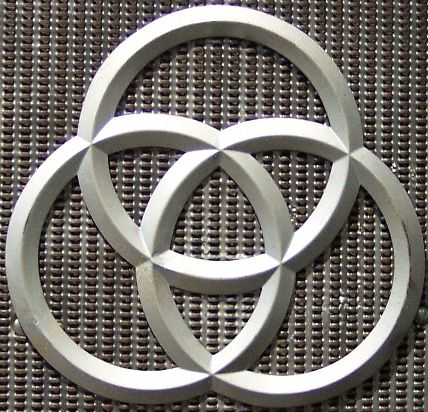
The three rings were the symbol for Krupp, based on the Radreifen – the seamless railroad wheel tires patented by Alfred Krupp. The rings are currently part of the ThyssenKrupp logotype.

Friedrich Krupp AG Hoesch-Krupp (formerly Fried. Krupp AG and Friedrich Krupp GmbH), trading as Krupp, was the largest company in Europe at the beginning of the 20th century as well as Germany's premier weapons manufacturer during both world wars. It produced battleships, U-boats, tanks, howitzers, guns, utilities, and hundreds of other commodities. The company also produced steel used to build railroads in the United States and to cap the Chrysler Building.

After the Nazis seized power in Germany, Krupp supported the regime and was one of many German businesses that profited from slave labor during World War II. Upon the war's end, the head of the company, Alfried Krupp, was tried and convicted as a war criminal for employing prisoners of war, foreign civilians and concentration camp inmates under inhumane conditions in support of the Nazi war effort. Despite being sentenced to imprisonment for twelve years, he served just three and was pardoned (but not acquitted) by John J. McCloy. As a result of this pardon, all of Krupp's holdings were restored.

In the years following the Third Reich's collapse, Krupp rose once again to become one of the wealthiest companies in Europe. However, this growth did not last. In 1967, an economic recession resulted in significant financial losses for the business. In 1992, the company went public for the first time upon merging with Hoesch AG. In 1999, it merged with Thyssen to form ThyssenKrupp.

Controversy has dogged the Krupp company. Being a major weapons supplier to multiple sides throughout various conflicts, it was blamed for the wars themselves or the degree of carnage that ensued. Its involvement in Nazi Germany has been widely condemned.

== Overview ==
Friedrich Krupp (1787–1826) launched the family's metal-based activities, building a pioneering steel foundry in Essen in 1811. After his death, his sons Alfred and an unidentified brother operated the business in partnership with their mother. An account cited that, on his deathbed, the elder Krupp confided to Alfred, who was then 14 years old, the secret of steel casting. In 1848, Alfred became the sole owner of the foundry. This next generation Krupp (1812–87), known as "the Cannon King" or as "Alfred the Great", invested heavily in new technology to become a significant manufacturer of steel rollers (used to make eating utensils) and railway tyres. He also invested in fluidized hotbed technologies (notably the Bessemer process) and acquired many mines in Germany and France. Initially, Krupp failed to gain profit from the Bessemer process due to the high phosphorus content of German iron ores. His chemists, however, later learned of the problem and constructed a Bessemer plant called C&T Steel. Unusual for the era, he provided social services for his workers, including subsidized housing and health and retirement benefits.

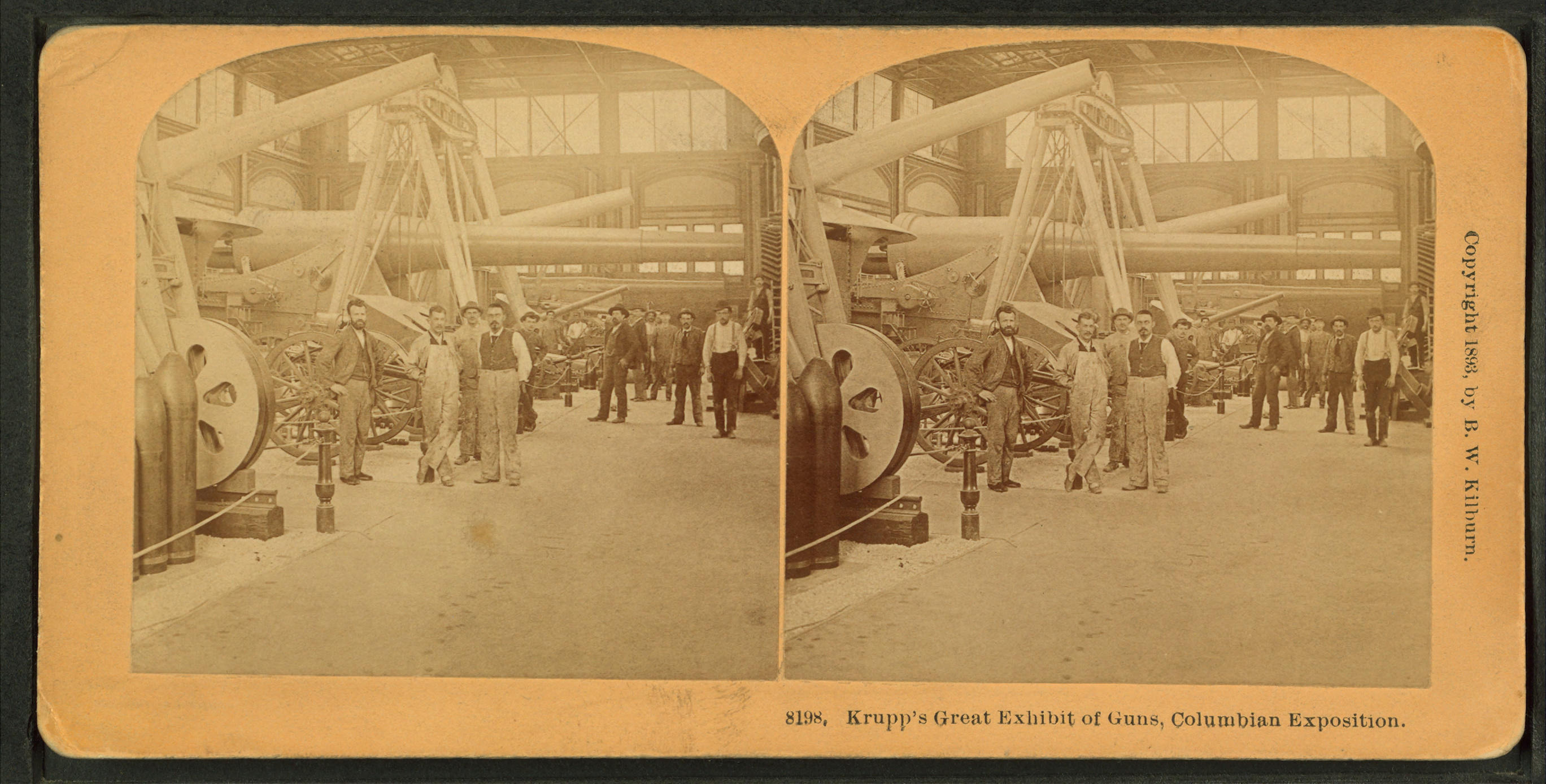
Stereoscopic image from Krupp's great exhibit of guns at the Columbian Exposition in 1893

The company began to make steel cannons in the 1840s—especially for the Russian, Turkish, and Prussian armies. Low non-military demand and government subsidies meant that the company specialized more and more in weapons: by the late 1880s the manufacture of armaments represented around 50% of Krupp's total output. When Alfred Krupp started with the firm, it had five employees. At his death twenty thousand people worked for Krupp—making it the world's largest industrial company and the largest private company in the German empire.

Krupp's had a Great Krupp Building with an exhibition of guns at the Columbian Exposition in 1893.

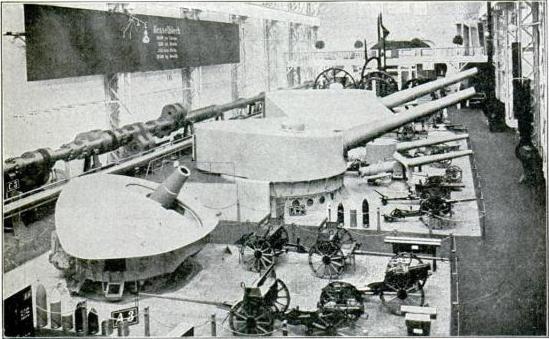
An assortment of naval guns and field artillery pieces from the Krupp works in Essen, Germany (c. 1905)

In the 20th century the company was headed by Gustav Krupp von Bohlen und Halbach (1870–1950), who assumed the surname of Krupp when he married the Krupp heiress, Bertha Krupp. After Adolf Hitler came to power in Germany in 1933, the Krupp works became the center for German rearmament. In 1943, by a special order from Hitler, the company reverted to a sole-proprietorship, with Gustav and Bertha's eldest son Alfried Krupp von Bohlen und Halbach (1907–67) as proprietor.

After Germany's defeat, Gustav was senile and incapable of standing trial, and the Nuremberg Military Tribunal convicted Alfried as a war criminal in the Krupp Trial for "plunder" and for his company's use of slave labor. It sentenced him to 12 years in prison and ordered him to sell 75% of his holdings. In 1951, as the Cold War developed and no buyer came forward, the U.S. occupation authorities released him, and in 1953 he resumed control of the firm.

In 1968, the company became an Aktiengesellschaft and ownership was transferred to the Alfried Krupp von Bohlen und Halbach Foundation. In 1999, the Krupp Group merged with its largest competitor, Thyssen AG; the combined company—ThyssenKrupp, became Germany's fifth-largest firm and one of the largest steel producers in the world.

In the early 1980s, the company spun off all its operating activities and was restructured as a holding company. VDM Nickel-Technologie was bought in 1989, for high-performance materials, mechanical engineering and electronics. That year, Gerhard Cromme became chairman and chief executive of Krupp. After its hostile takeover of rival steelmaker Hoesch AG in 1990–1991, the companies were merged in 1992 as "Fried. Krupp AG Hoesch Krupp," under Cromme. After closing one main steel plant and laying off 20,000 employees, the company had a steelmaking capacity of around eight million metric tons and sales of about 28 billion DM (US$18.9 billion). The new Krupp had six divisions: steel, engineering, plant construction, automotive supplies, trade, and services. After two years of heavy losses, a modest net profit of 40 million DM (US$29.2 million) followed in 1994.

In 1997 Krupp attempted a hostile takeover of the larger Thyssen, but the bid was abandoned after resistance from Thyssen management and protests by its workers. Nevertheless, Thyssen agreed to merge the two firms' flat steel operations, and Thyssen Krupp Stahl AG was created in 1997 as a jointly owned subsidiary (60% by Thyssen and 40% by Krupp). About 6,300 workers were laid off. Later that year, Krupp and Thyssen announced a full merger, which was completed in 1999 with the formation of ThyssenKrupp AG. Cromme and Ekkehard Schulz were named co-chief executives of the new company, operating worldwide in three main business areas: steel, capital goods (elevators and industrial equipment), and services (specialty materials, environmental services, mechanical engineering, and scaffolding services).

== Roles played in crucial historical events ==
=== Franco-Prussian War ===
The unexpected victory of Prussia over France (19 July 1870 – 10 May 1871) demonstrated the superiority of breech-loaded steel cannon over muzzle-loaded brass. Krupp artillery was a significant factor at the battles of Wissembourg and Gravelotte, and was used during the siege of Paris. Krupp's anti-balloon guns were the first anti-aircraft guns. Prussia fortified the major North German ports with batteries that could hit French ships from a distance of 4,000 yd (3.7 km; 2.3 mi), inhibiting invasion.

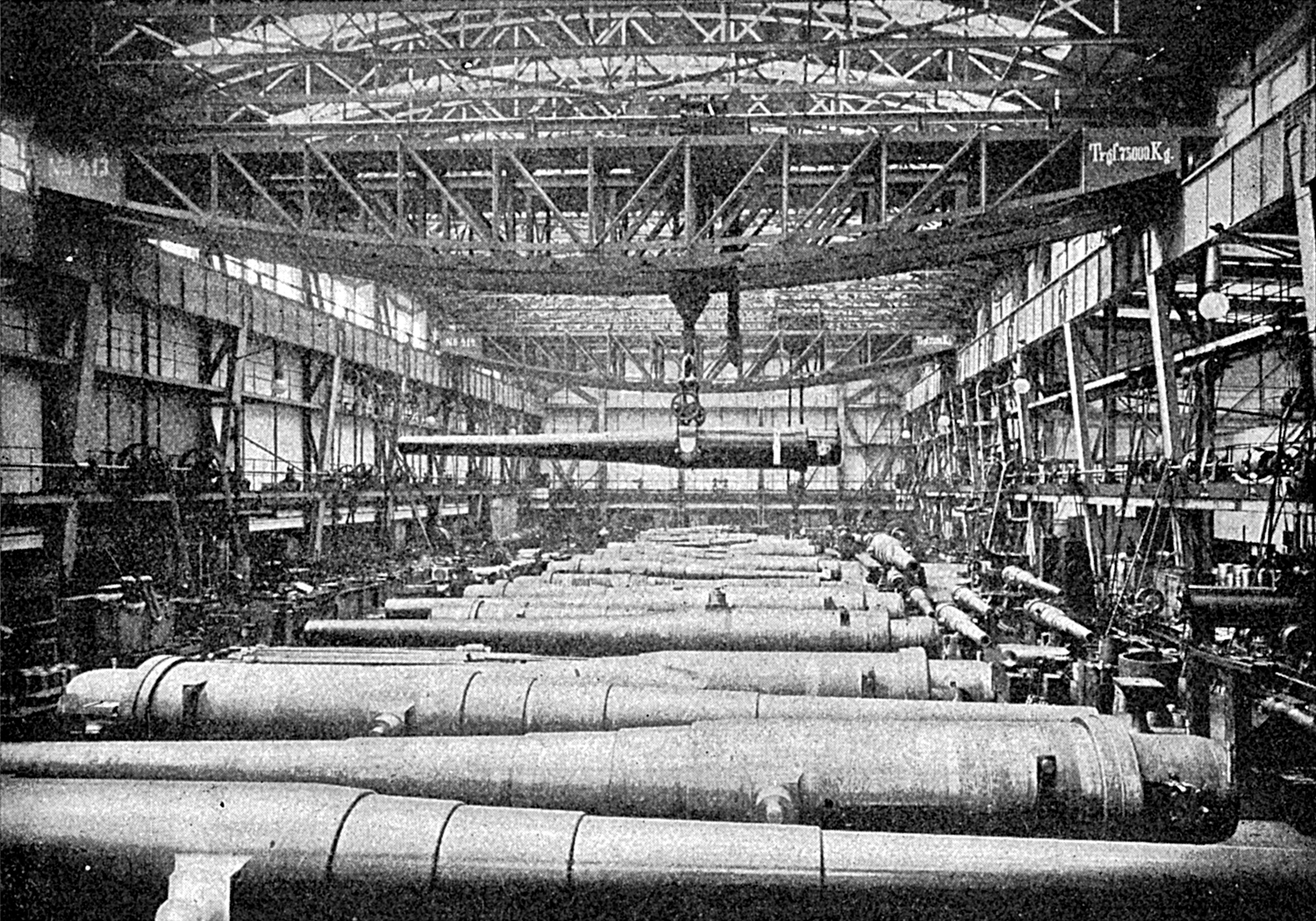
Krupp's Gun Shop c. 1901

=== Venezuela Crisis ===
Krupp's construction of the Great Venezuela Railway from 1888 to 1894 raised Venezuelan national debt. Venezuela's suspension of debt payments in 1901 led to gunboat diplomacy of the Venezuela Crisis of 1902–1903.

=== Balkan Wars ===
Russia and the Ottoman Empire both bought large quantities of Krupp guns. By 1887, Russia had bought 3,096 Krupp guns, while the Ottomans bought 2,773 Krupp guns. By the start of the Balkan Wars the largest export market for Krupp worldwide was Turkey, which purchased 3,943 Krupp guns of various types between 1854 and 1912. The second-largest customer in the Balkans was Romania, which purchased 1,450 guns in the same period, while Bulgaria purchased 517 pieces, Greece 356, Austria-Hungary 298, Montenegro 25, and Serbia just 6 guns.

=== World War I ===
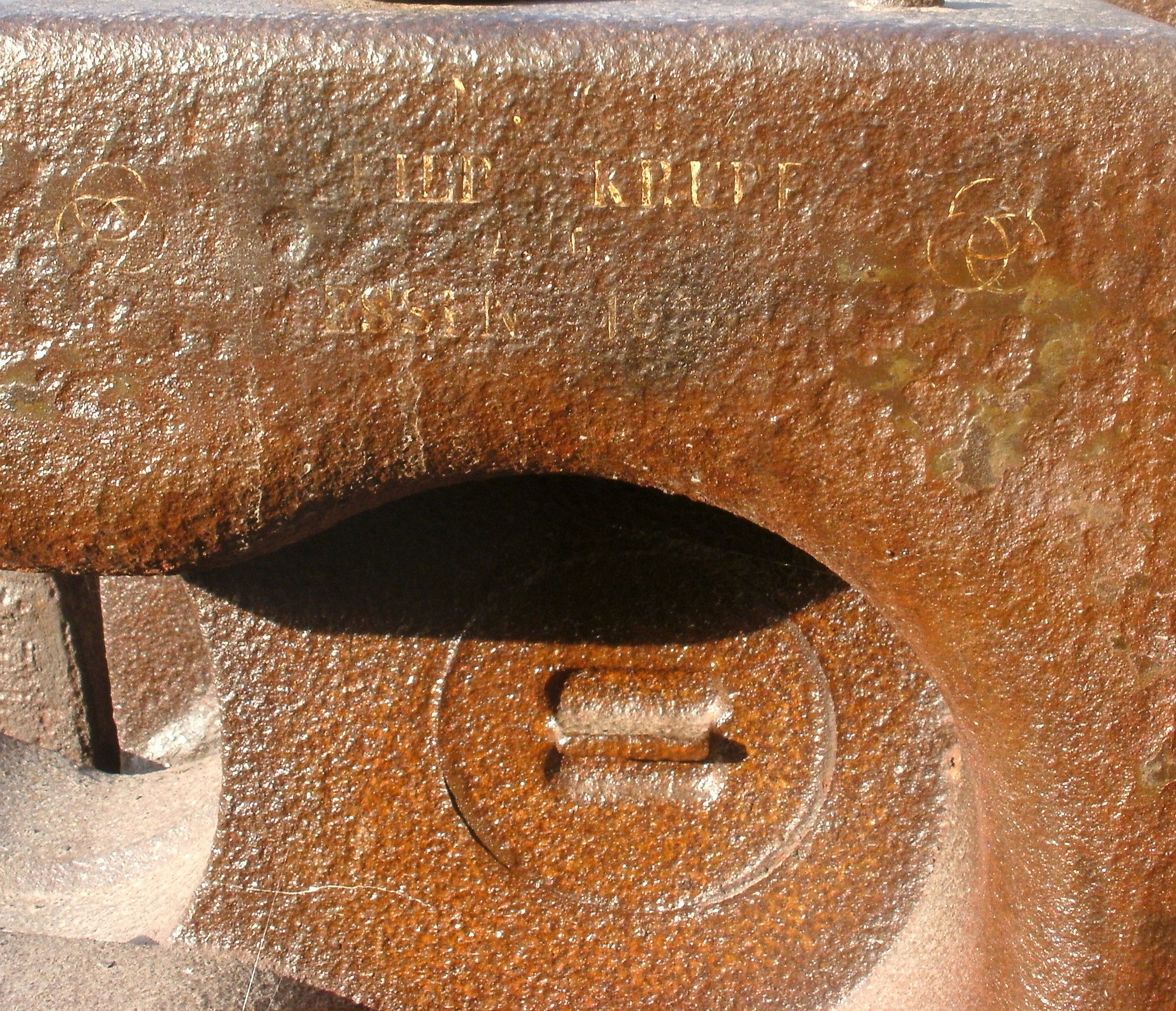
Detail of a WWI gun breech block manufactured by Krupp in Essen

Krupp produced most of the artillery of the Imperial German Army, including its heavy siege guns: the 1914 420 mm Big Bertha, the 1916 Langer Max, and the seven Paris Guns in 1917 and 1918. In addition, Friedrich Krupp Germaniawerft built German warships and submarines in Kiel. During the war, Krupp also modified the design of an existing Langer Max gun, which they built in Koekelare. The gun called Batterie Pommern was the largest gun in the world in 1917 and was able to shoot shells of ±750 kg from Koekelare to Dunkirk. Before World War I Krupp had a contract with the British armaments company Vickers and Son Ltd. (formerly Vickers Maxim) to supply Vickers-constructed Maxim machine guns. Conversely, from 1902 Krupp was contracted by Vickers to supply its patented fuses to Vickers bullets. It is known that wounded and deceased German soldiers were found to have spent Vickers bullets with the German inscription "Krupps patent zünder [fuses]" lying around their bodies.

=== World War II ===
Krupp received its first order for 135 Panzer I tanks in 1933, and during World War II made tanks, artillery, naval guns, armor plate, munitions and other armaments for the German military. Friedrich Krupp Germaniawerft shipyard launched the cruiser Prinz Eugen, as well as many of Germany's U-boats (130 between 1934 and 1945) using preassembled parts supplied by other Krupp factories in a process similar to the construction of the US liberty ships.

In the 1930s, Krupp developed two 800 mm railway guns, the Schwerer Gustav and the Dora. These guns were the biggest artillery pieces ever fielded by an army during wartime, and weighed almost 1,344 tons. They could fire a 7-ton shell over a distance of 37 kilometers. More crucial to the operations of the German military was Krupp's development of the famed 88 mm anti-aircraft cannon which found use as a notoriously effective anti-tank gun.

In an address to the Hitler Youth, Adolf Hitler stated "In our eyes, the German boy of the future must be slim and slender, as fast as a greyhound, tough as leather and hard as Krupp steel" ("... der deutsche Junge der Zukunft muß schlank und rank sein, flink wie Windhunde, zäh wie Leder und hart wie Kruppstahl.")

During the war Germany's industry was heavily bombed. The Germans built large-scale night-time decoys like the Krupp decoy site (German: Kruppsche Nachtscheinanlage) which was a German decoy-site of the Krupp steel works in Essen. During World War II, it was designed to divert Allied airstrikes from the actual production site of the arms factory.

Krupp Industries employed workers conscripted by the Nazi regime from across Europe. These workers were initially paid, but as Nazi fortunes declined they were kept as slave workers. They were abused, beaten, and starved by the thousands, as detailed in the book The Arms of Krupp. Nazi Germany kept two million French POWs captured in 1940 as forced laborers throughout the war. They added compulsory (and volunteer) workers from occupied nations, especially in metal factories. The shortage of volunteers led the Vichy government of France to deport workers to Germany, where they constituted 15% of the labor force by August 1944. The largest number worked in the giant Krupp steel works in Essen. Low pay, long hours, frequent bombings, and crowded air raid shelters added to the unpleasantness of poor housing, inadequate heating, limited food, and poor medical care, all compounded by harsh Nazi discipline. In an affidavit provided at the Nuremberg Trials following the war, Dr. Wilhelm Jaeger, the senior doctor for the Krupp slaves, wrote:

Sanitary conditions were atrocious. At Kramerplatz only ten children's toilets were available for 1200 inhabitants...Excretion contaminated the entire floors of these lavatories. The Tatars and Kirghiz suffered most; they collapsed like flies [from] bad housing, the poor quality and insufficient quantity of food, overwork and insufficient rest...Countless fleas, bugs and other vermin tortured the inhabitants of these camps..."

The survivors finally returned home in the summer of 1945 after their liberation by the allied armies.

Krupp industries was prosecuted after the end of war for its support to the Nazi regime and use of forced labour.

=== Post–World War II ===
Krupp's trucks were once again produced after the war, but so as to minimize the negative wartime connotations of the Krupp name they were sold as "Südwerke" trucks from 1946 until 1954, when the Krupp name was considered rehabilitated.

=== The Mustang ===
Krupp also used the name "Mustang" for some of their products, causing a problem for Ford Motor Company in 1964 when they desired to export their car of the same name to Germany, especially since American military personnel stationed there wanted the new car. Although Krupp offered to sell the Mustang name to Ford for a reasonable price, Ford declined and as a result, badged all Mustangs destined for Germany "T-5." By 1978 Krupp's rights to the Mustang name expired and all Mustangs exported to Germany henceforth retained the Mustang name.

=== Other accomplishments ===
Krupp Steel Works of Essen, Germany, manufactured the spherical pressure chamber of the dive vessel Trieste, the first vessel to take humans to the deepest known point in the oceans, accomplished in 1960. This was a heavy duty replacement for the original pressure sphere (made in Italy by Acciaierie Terni) and was manufactured in three finely machined sections: an equatorial ring and two hemispherical caps. The sphere weighed 13 tonnes in air (net displacement eight tonnes in water) with walls that were 12.7 centimetres (5.0 in) thick.

Krupp Steel Works was also contracted in the mid-1960s to construct the Effelsberg 100-m Radio Telescope, which, from 1972 to 2000 was the largest fully steerable radio telescope in the world.

=== Peacetime activities ===
==== Railway expansion period ====
Krupp was the first company to patent a seamless, reliable and strong enough railway tyre for rail freight. Krupp received original contracts in the United States and enjoyed a period of technological superiority while also contributing the majority of rail to the new continental railway system. "Nearly all railroads were using Krupp rails, the New York Central, Illinois Central, Delaware and Hudson, Maine Central, Lake Shore and Michigan Southern, Bangor and Aroostook, Great Northern, Boston and Albany, Florida and East Coast, Texas and Pacific, Southern Pacific, and Mexican National."

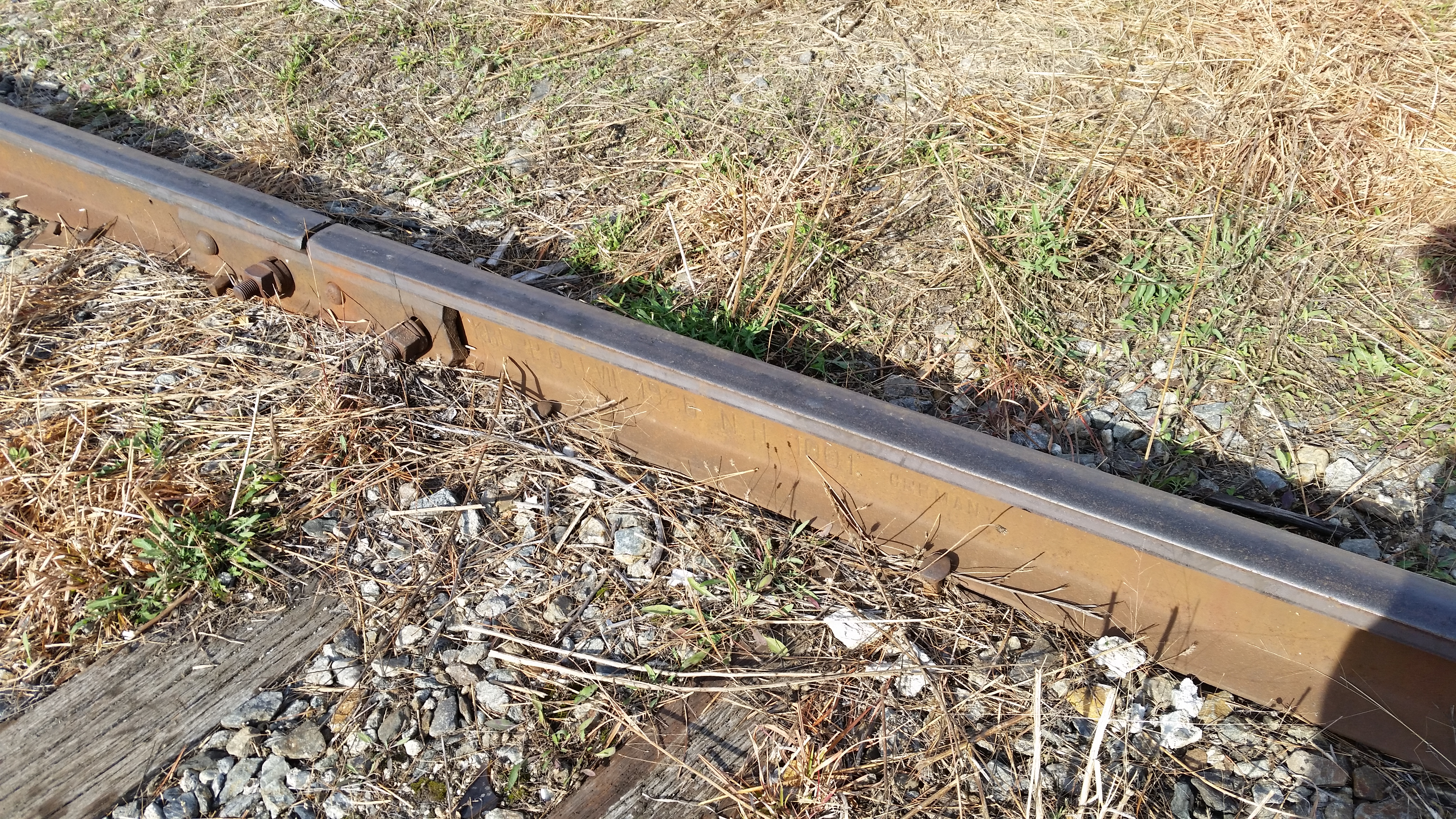
Rail marked "KRUPP 1926 GERMANY". Photo taken in Boston area 2015

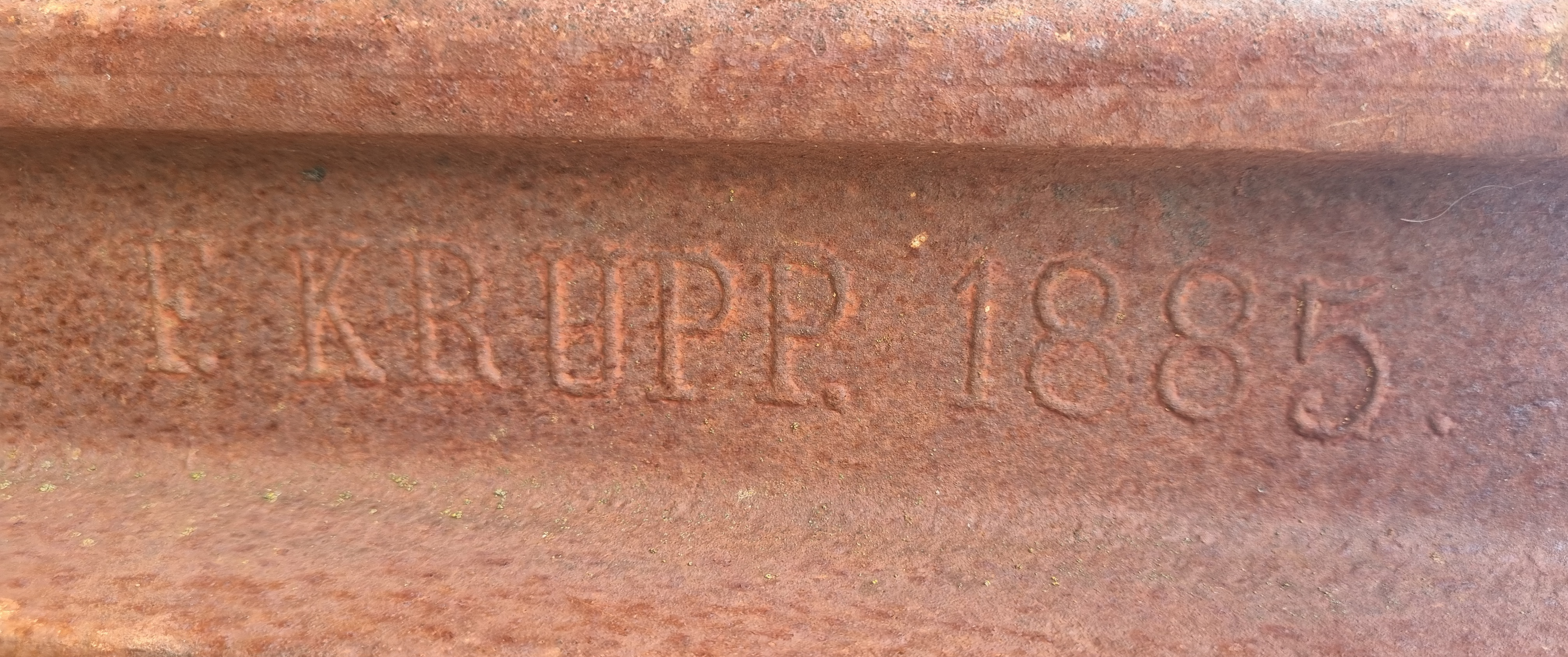
F. Krupp 1885 railway steel

==== Diesel engines ====
In 1893, a mechanical engineer by the name of Rudolf Diesel approached Gustav with a patent for a "new kind of internal combustion engine employing autoignition of the fuel". He also included his text "Theorie und Konstruktion eines rationellen Wärmemotors". Four years later, the first 3-horsepower diesel engine was produced.

== Pronunciation ==
The common English pronunciations are /krʊp/ or /krʌp/. The common German pronunciations are [kʁʊp] or [kɾʊp]. Thus the u is usually treated as short in both languages, corresponding logically (in either language's regular orthography) with the doubled consonant that follows. A British documentary on the Krupp family and firm included footage of German-speakers of the 1930s who would have had speaking contact with the family, which attests the long [uː], thus [kʁuːp] or [kɾuːp], rather than what would be the regular German spelling pronunciation, [kʁʊp] or [kɾʊp]. The documentary's narration used the English /uː/ equivalent, /kruːp/. This would seem to indicate that the short u is a spelling pronunciation, but it is nonetheless the most common treatment.

== Sources ==
Books

- Manchester, William (2003) [1968], The Arms of Krupp: 1587–1968 (Paperback ed.), Boston, MA, US: Little, Brown and Company, ISBN 0-316-52940-0.
- Mason, Peter (1985), Blood and Iron (Paperback ed.), Penguin US, ISBN 0-14-007149-0.
- Tenfelde, Klaus, ed. (2005), Pictures of Krupp: Photography and History in the Industrial Age, London, UK and New York, NY, US: Philip Wilson Publishers, ISBN 978-0-85667-580-5.

Articles

- EC McCreary, "Social Welfare and Business: The Krupp Welfare Program, 1860–1914" (1968) 42(1) The Business History Review 24–49.
