= Beitz =

Beitz is a German surname. Notable people with the surname include:

- Berthold Beitz (1913–2013), German industrialist
- Charles Beitz (born 1949), American political theorist
- Else Beitz (1920–2014), German scholar and Holocaust hero
- Falko Beitz (born 1986), German politician

== See also ==
- Betz (surname)
