= Sabina Wolanski =

- Born: 8 June 1927; Boryslav
- Died: 23 June 2011 (aged 84); Sydney
- Citizenship: Poland
- Occupation: Author
- Awards: Medal of the order of Australia

Sabina Wolanski, born Sabina Haberman, married Sabina van der Linden-Wolanski OAM (8 June 1927 – 23 June 2011) was a Holocaust survivor and author. Her book Destined to Live: One Woman's War, Life, Loves Remembered is a memoir of her account of her experience of the Holocaust.

== Biography ==
Sabina Haberman, born in Borysław, Austrian partition of Poland (today Ukraine), was 12 years old when her home town in Poland was invaded by the Nazis. In her diary she recorded what happened, including the humiliations and terrors, the murder of her family and her survival. In Borysław, she met the industrialist Berthold Beitz, who had helped shelter Jews in Poland. Leaving Europe after the war, Wolanski began a new life in Australia. In 1967, she gave evidence in a trial in Bremen of Friedrich Hildebrand, the man who had killed her father and brother. While there, she met the daughter of a former Nazi who was researching her own past.

In May 2005, when Germany opened the Memorial to the Murdered Jews of Europe in Berlin, Wolanski was chosen to speak on behalf of the six million dead. In her speech she noted that although the Holocaust had taken everything she valued, it had also taught her that hatred and discrimination are doomed to fail. Her story was profiled on the ABC program Australian Story.

Wolanski died on 23 June 2011 in Sydney, aged 84.

Wolanski supported Sydney-based programs promoting intercultural understanding, including Courage to Care, which teaches schoolchildren to avoid discrimination, and Together for Humanity, a multi-faith charity which encourages inter-faith tolerance and understanding among schoolchildren.
