= Jarmen =

Town in Mecklenburg-Vorpommern, Germany

- Town
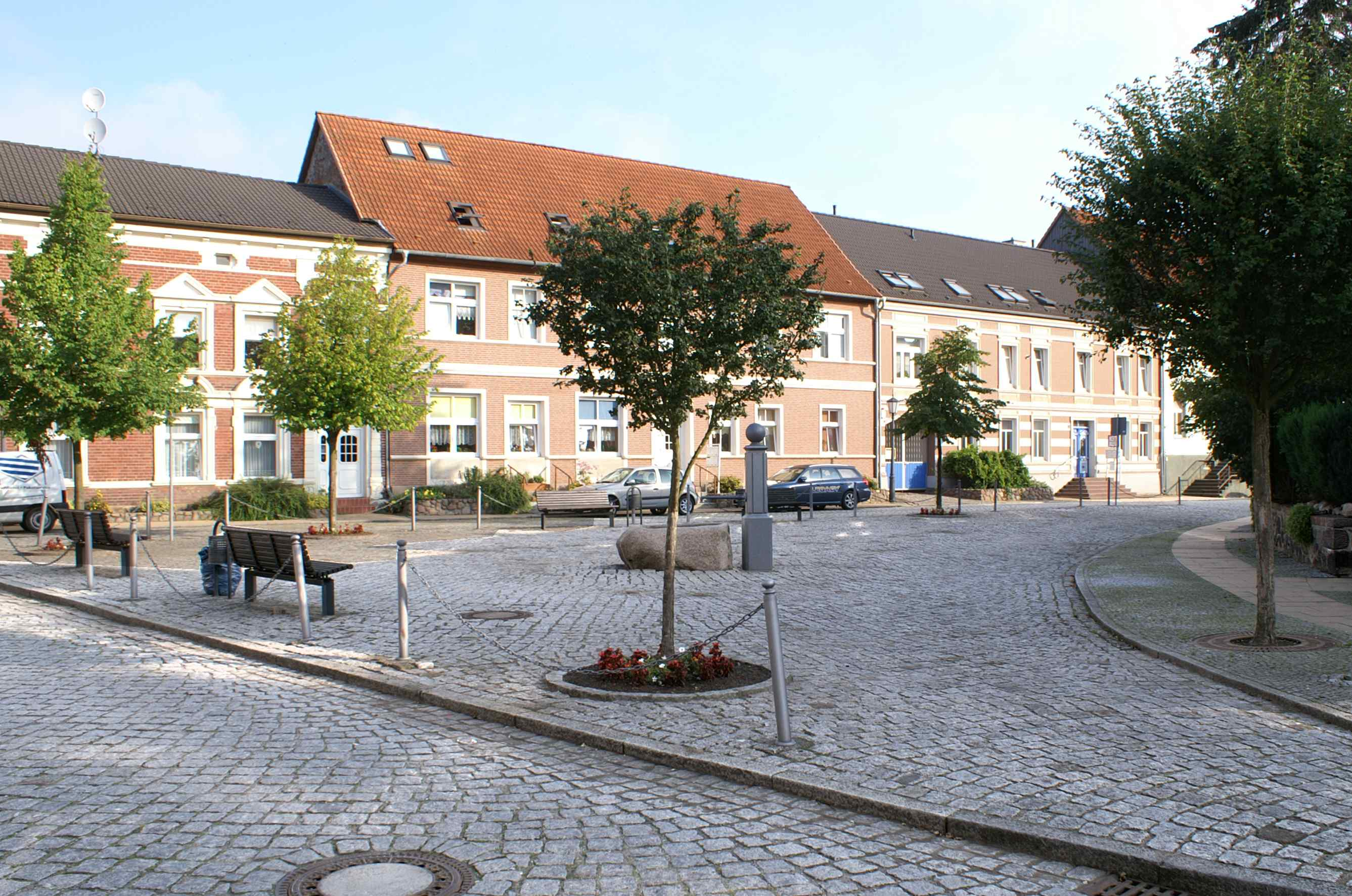
- Old Marketplace

- Coat of arms

- Location of Jarmen within Vorpommern-Greifswald district
- Interactive map of Jarmen
- Location within Germany Location within Mecklenburg-Vorpommern
- Coordinates: 53°55′N 13°20′E
- Country: Germany
- State: Mecklenburg-Vorpommern
- District: Vorpommern-Greifswald
- Municipal assoc.: Jarmen-Tutow
- Subdivisions: 8

Government
  - Mayor: Arno Karp

Area
  - Total: 30.71 km^{2} (11.86 sq mi)
- Elevation: 7 m (23 ft)

Population (2025-12-31)
  - Total: 2,716
  - Density: 88.44/km^{2} (229.1/sq mi)
- Time zone: UTC+01:00 (CET)
  - Summer (DST): UTC+02:00 (CEST)
- Postal codes: 17126
- Dialling codes: 039997
- Vehicle registration: DM
- Website: www.jarmen.de

Jarmen (German pronunciation: [ˈjaːɐ̯mən]) is a town in the Vorpommern-Greifswald district, in Mecklenburg-Western Pomerania, Germany. It is situated on the southern bank of the river Peene, 20 km south of Greifswald, in the historic region of Pomerania.

Founded during the Ostsiedlung in the medieval terrae Miserez and Ploth, Jarmen remained a rural town at an important Peene crossing. Jarmen was in the Duchy of Pomerania from its foundation until the Thirty Years' War, in Swedish Pomerania until the Great Northern War, in Prussian Pomerania until World War II, in the East German state of Mecklenburg-Vorpommern and later Bezirk Neubrandenburg until the peaceful revolution in 1989 and in the state of Mecklenburg-Vorpommern within reunited Germany since 1990. The Autobahn 20 crosses the Peene at Jarmen.

== Administrative division ==
In addition to the town itself, the following villages are within the Jarmen city limits:

- Plötz
- Neu Plötz
- Wilhelminenthal
- Groß Toitin
- Klein Toitin
- Kronsberg
- Müssentin

The municipality is within the Amt Jarmen-Tutow of Kreis Vorpommern-Greifswald.

== History ==
In the vicinity of Jarmen, remains of Stone and Bronze Age settlements have been found. In 690 AD, West Slavic Veleti settled the area. In the High Middle Ages, the area was known as the terrae of Miserez and Ploth.

The area was part of the Duchy of Pomerania, which in 1186 passed under Danish suzerainty, and in 1227 fell under the overlordship of the multi-ethnic Holy Roman Empire. The actual town was founded during the Ostsiedlung, after 1250. Documented as Germin (1269), Jermin (1277) or Jermyn (1290). The name comes from the Old Polabian male name Jaromin. It was part of the possessions of the Cammin bishops, until they gave it to Otto I, the Pomeranian duke, as a fief in 1305. Jarmen remained a small town, but prospered moderately because of its location at a ford and the maintenance of a ferry service since 1368. In 1631, Jarmen became seat of the Amt Ueckermünde. At this time, the Thirty Years' War had already reached the area, which became Swedish in the following.

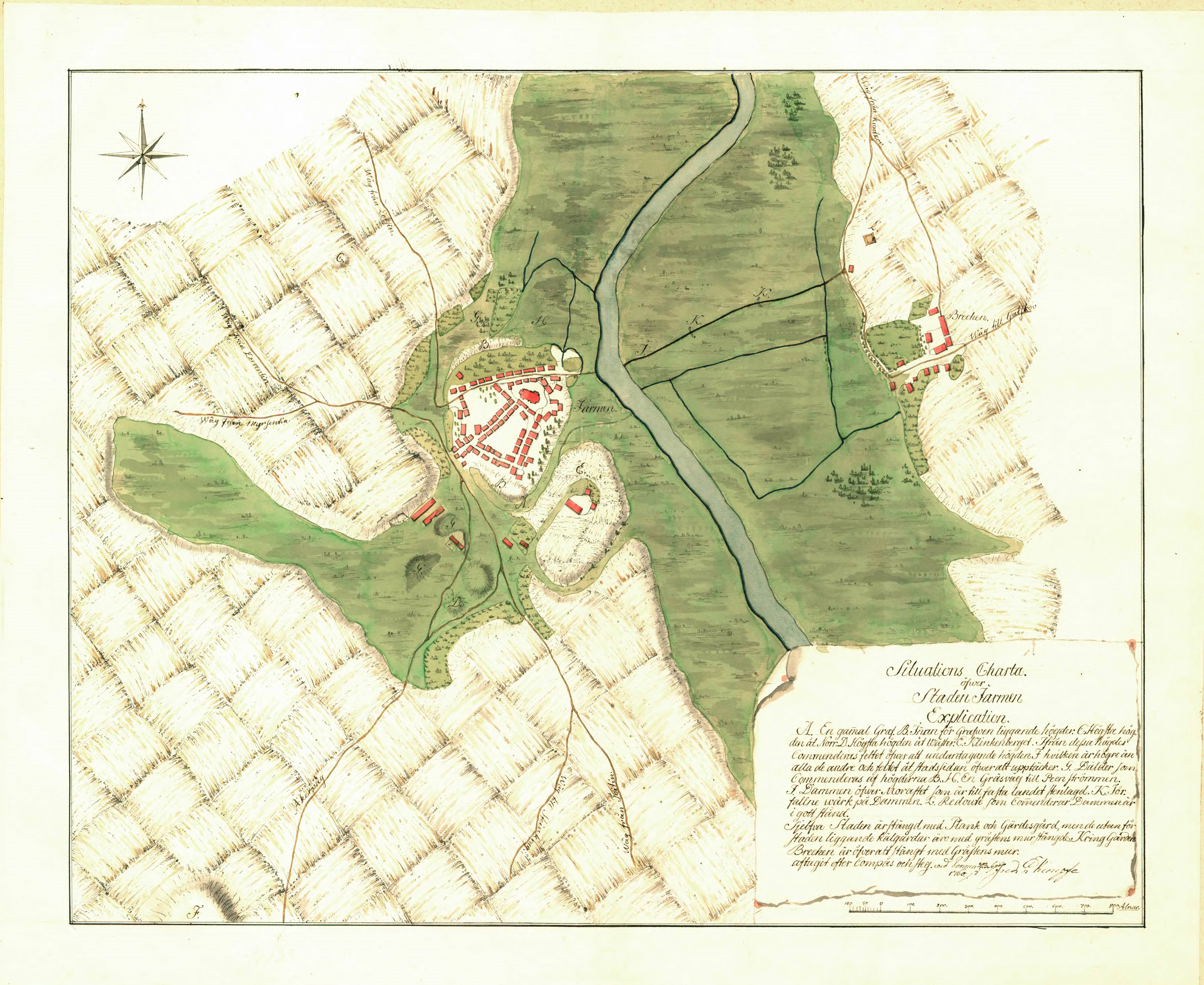
Citymap of Jarmen from 1760

Jarmen remained with Swedish Pomerania until 1720, when the area south of the Peene river became Prussian as a consequence of the Great Northern Wars. In 1742 and 1839, parts of the town burned down. In 1863, the ferry was replaced with a bridge over the Peene river. Since the late 19th century, Jarmen was connected to nearby towns by narrow gauge railways: In 1893 to Anklam and Friedland by the Mecklenburg-Pommersche Schmalspurbahn, and in 1897 to Altentreptow and Demmin by the Demminer Kleinbahn Ost as well as to Greifswald and Züssow by the Greifswald-Jarmener Kleinbahn. None of these narrow gauge railways exist anymore.

In the final stages of World War II, in 1945, the Germans evacuated several thousand of French prisoners of war from the Stalag II-D prisoner-of-war camp in Stargard to Jarmen. In 1945, the Prussian province of Pomerania was de facto dissolved as a consequence of World War II, and Jarmen became part of the Soviet Occupation Zone, since 1949 East Germany. Since 1990, Jarmen is within the state of Mecklenburg-Vorpommern in reunited Germany. Jarmen remained the site of an important Peene crossing, the modern routes crossing the river at Jarmen are Autobahn 20 and L35, formerly Bundesstraße 96.

== Gallery ==
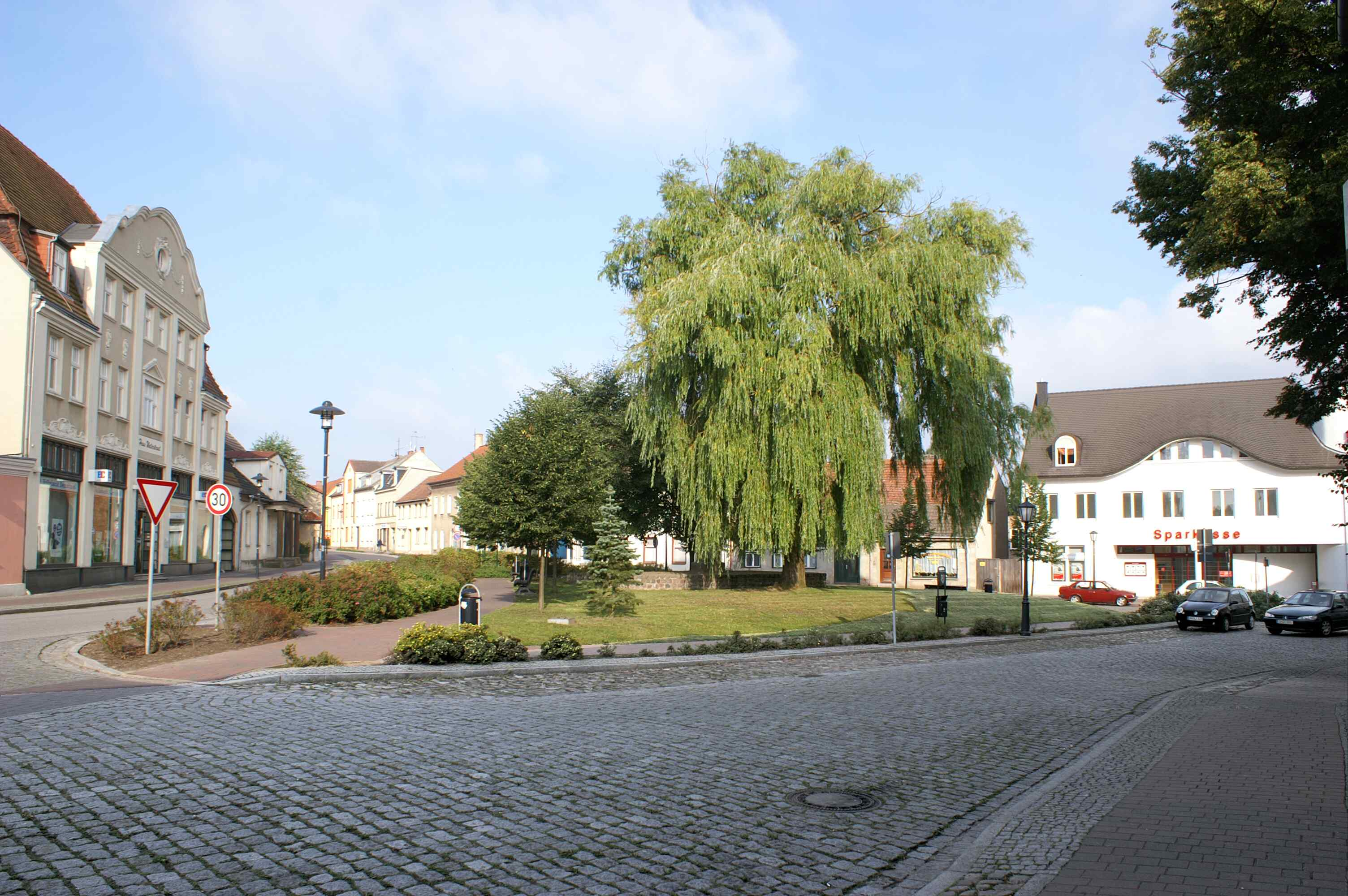
New Marketplace

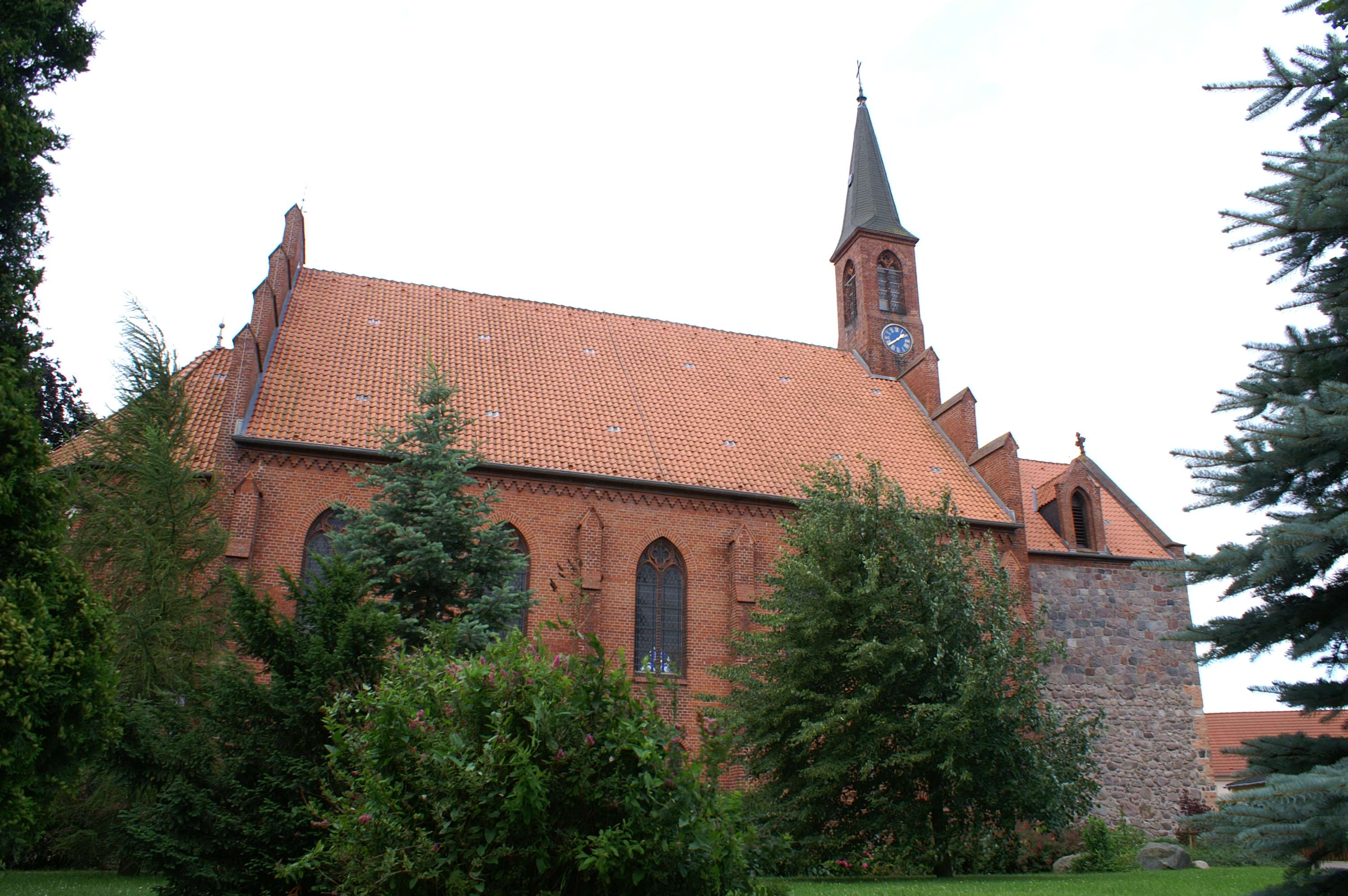
Saint Mary Church

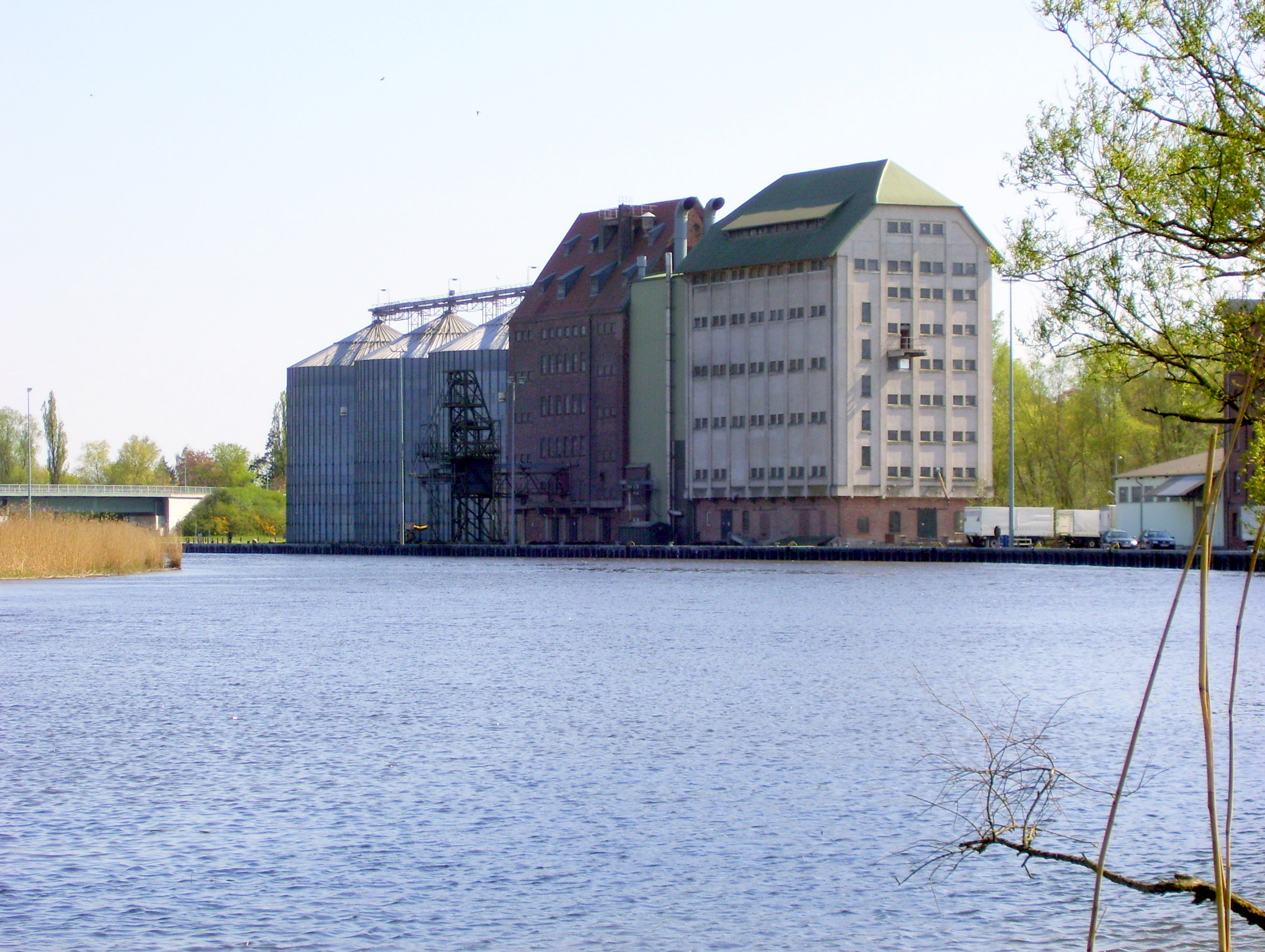
Granaries at the harbour

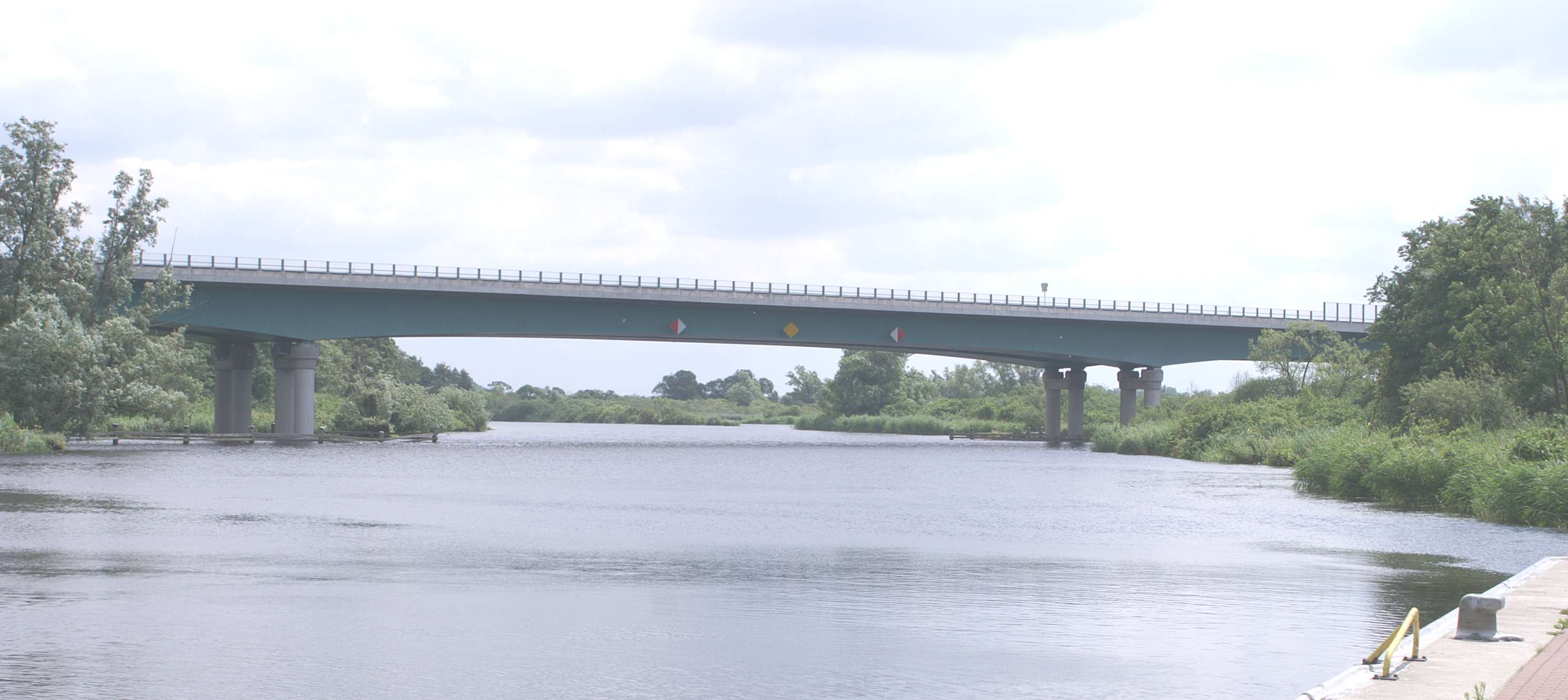
Peene bridge
