= Daberkow =

- Municipality
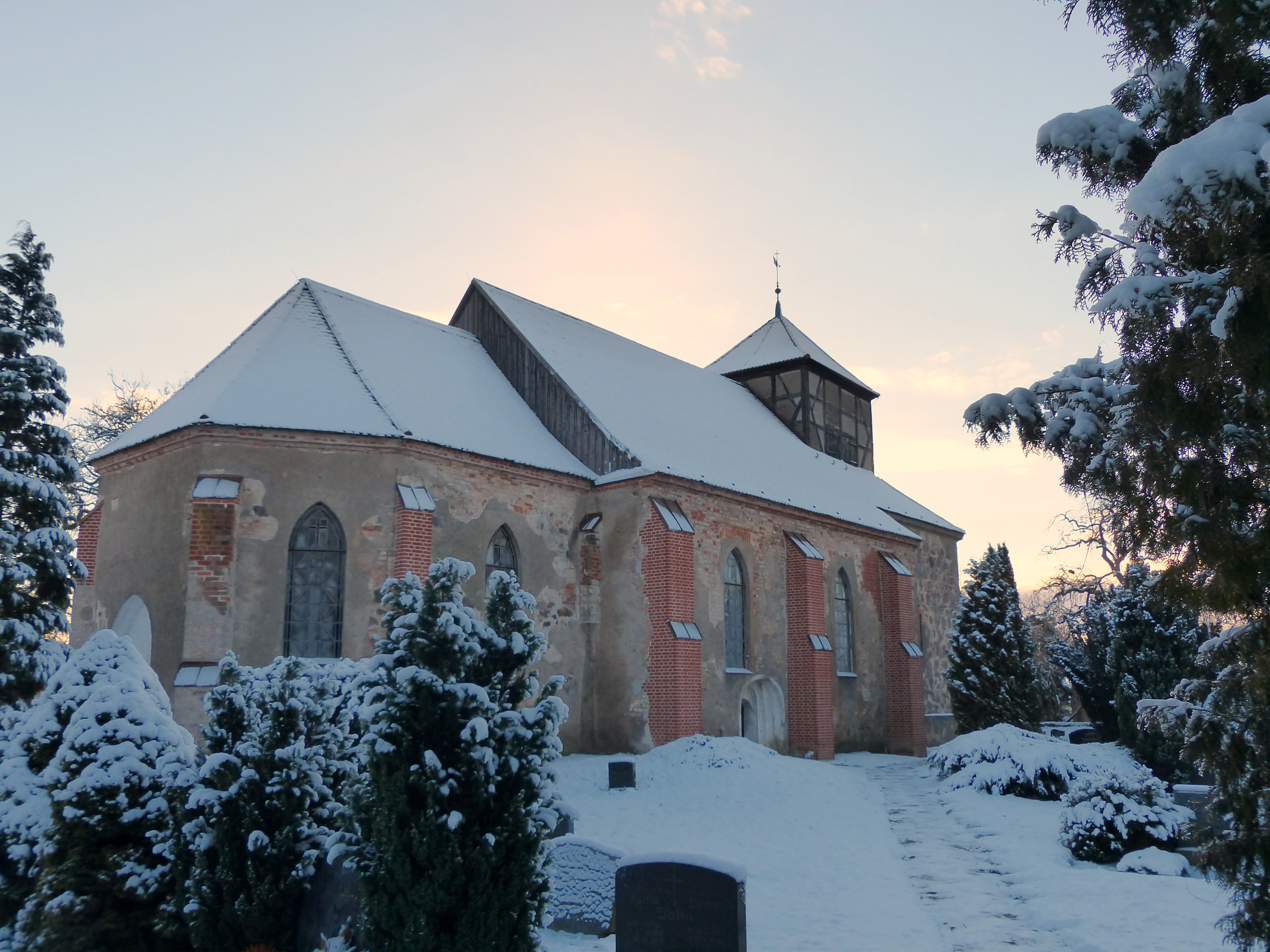
- Village church in Daberkow

- Location of Daberkow within Vorpommern-Greifswald district
- Interactive map of Daberkow
- Location within Germany Location within Mecklenburg-Vorpommern
- Coordinates: 53°50′N 13°18′E
- Country: Germany
- State: Mecklenburg-Vorpommern
- District: Vorpommern-Greifswald
- Municipal assoc.: Jarmen-Tutow
- Subdivisions: 3

Government
  - Mayor: Gerd-Heinrich Kröchert

Area
  - Total: 15.39 km^{2} (5.94 sq mi)
- Elevation: 19 m (62 ft)

Population (2025-12-31)
  - Total: 325
  - Density: 21.1/km^{2} (54.7/sq mi)
- Time zone: UTC+01:00 (CET)
  - Summer (DST): UTC+02:00 (CEST)
- Postal codes: 17129
- Dialling codes: 039991
- Vehicle registration: DM
- Website: www.jarmen.de

Daberkow is a municipality in the Vorpommern-Greifswald district, in Mecklenburg-Vorpommern, Germany. Its population in 2021 was 329.
