= Boryslav =

City in Lviv Oblast, Ukraine

Boryslav Борислав
- City
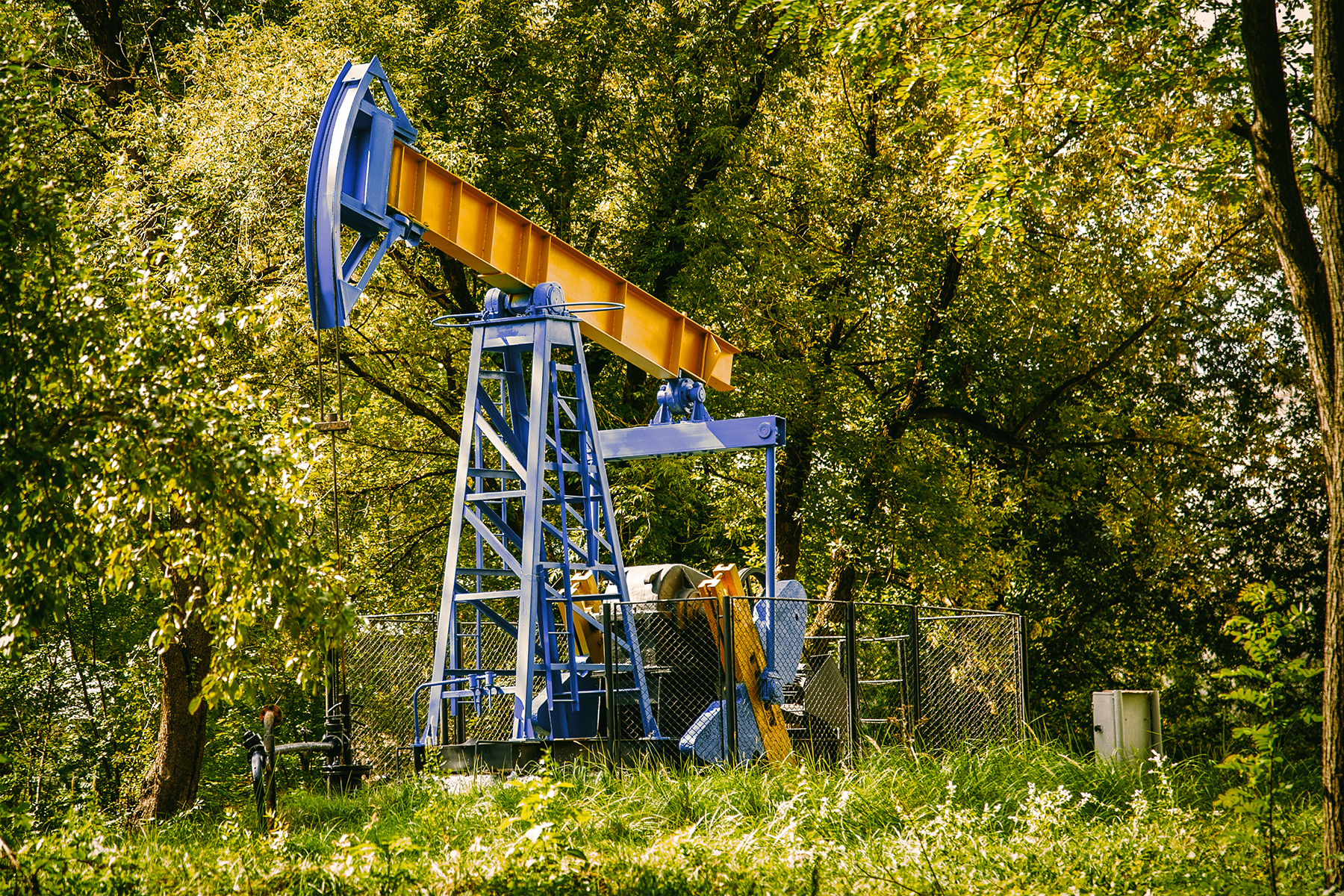
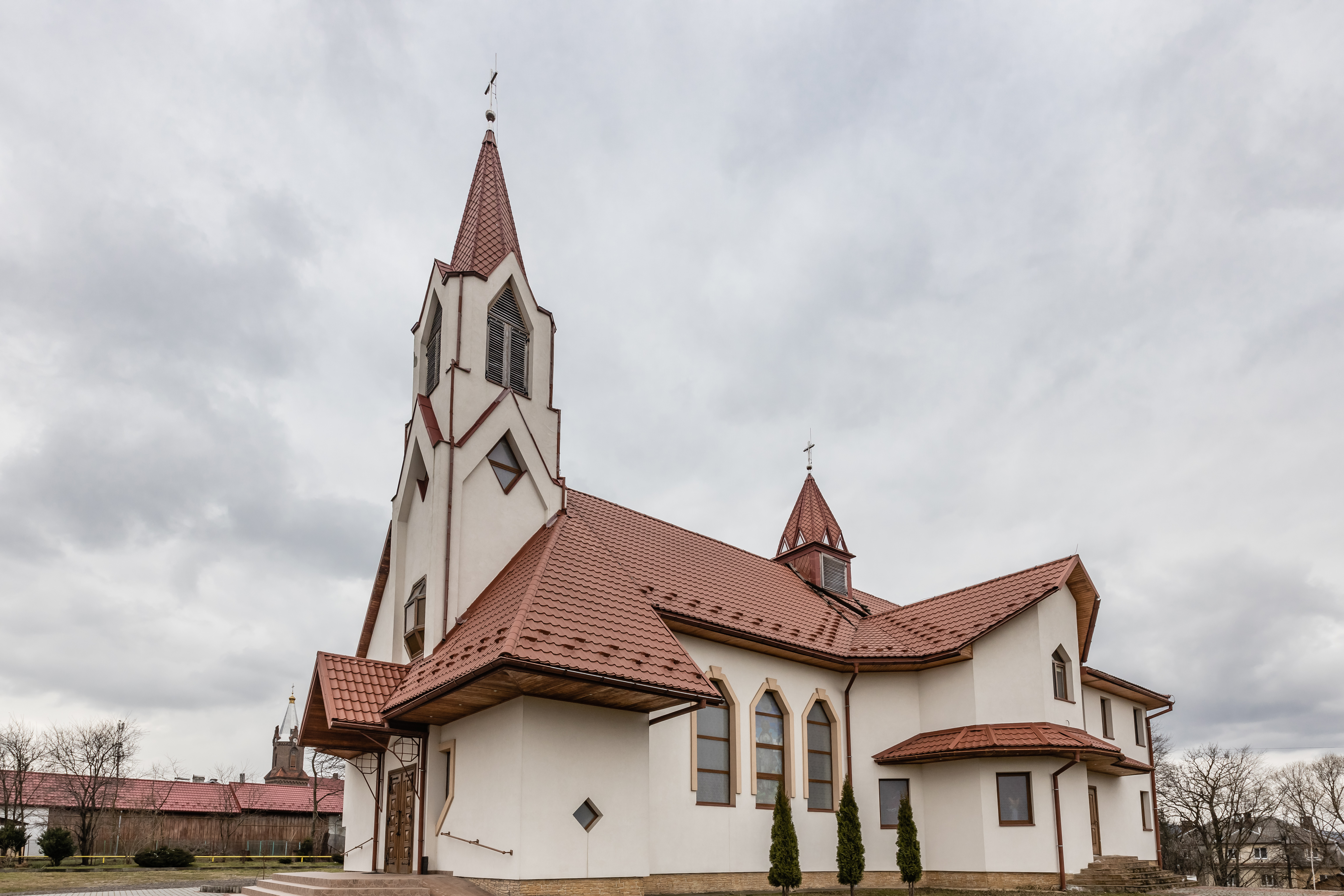
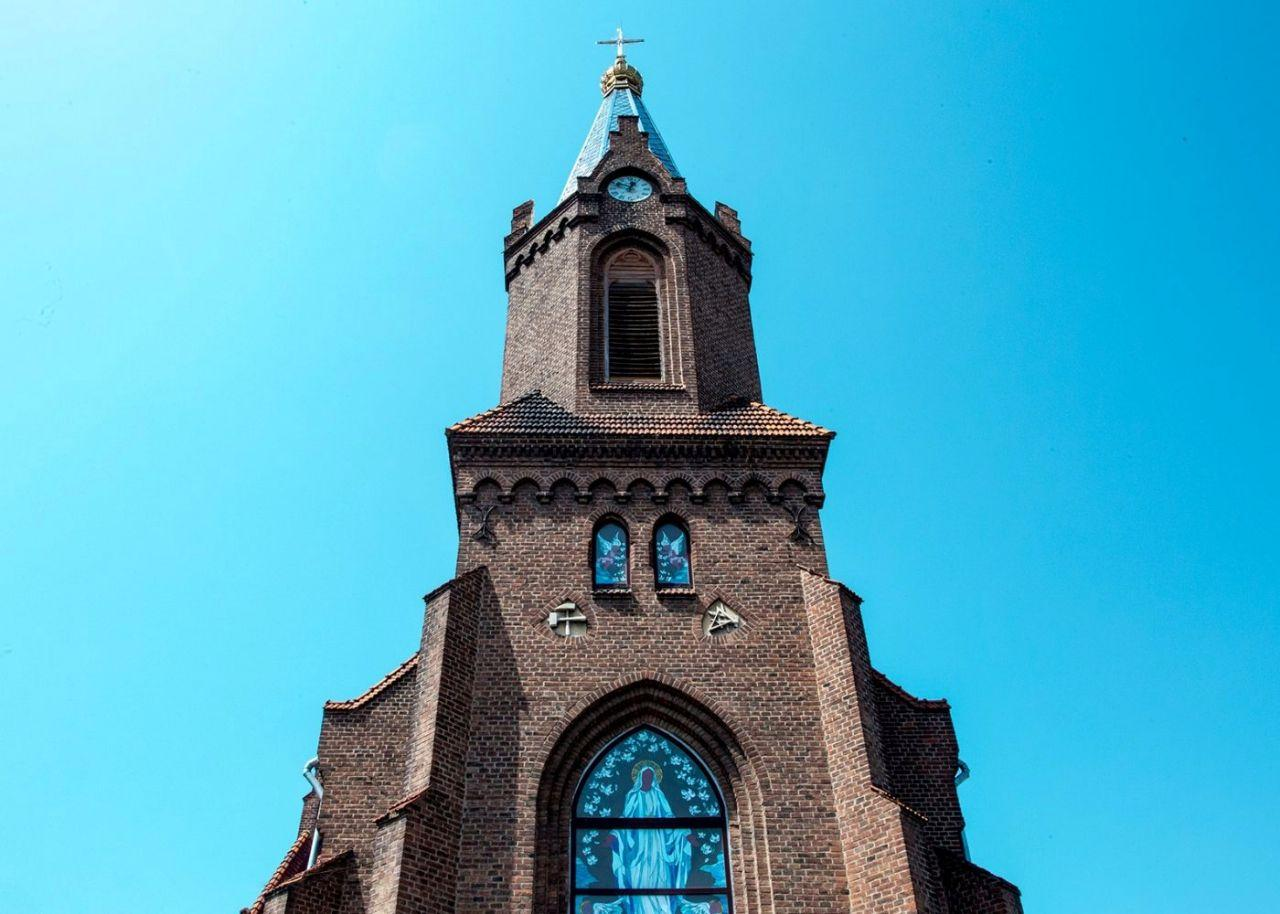
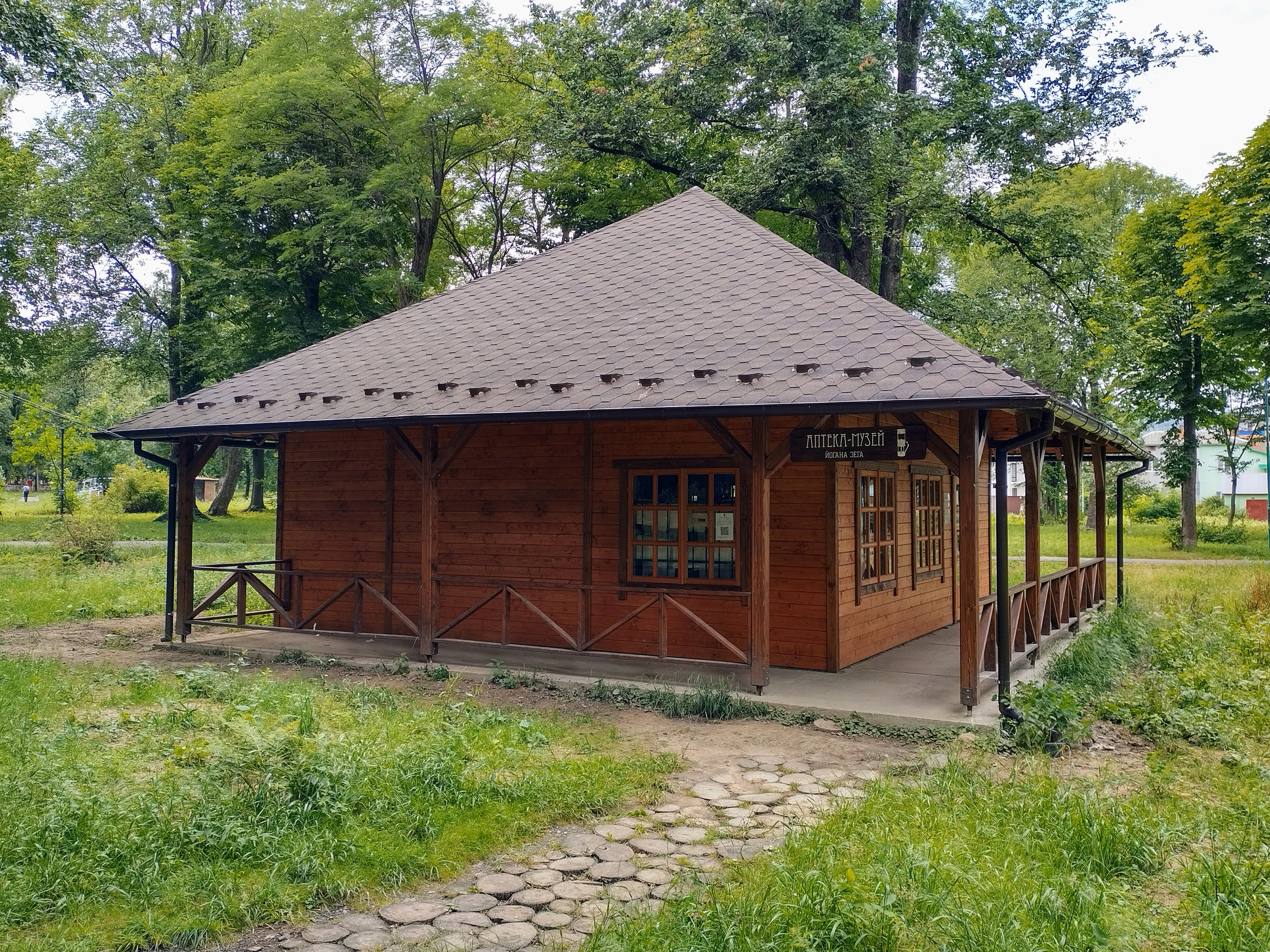
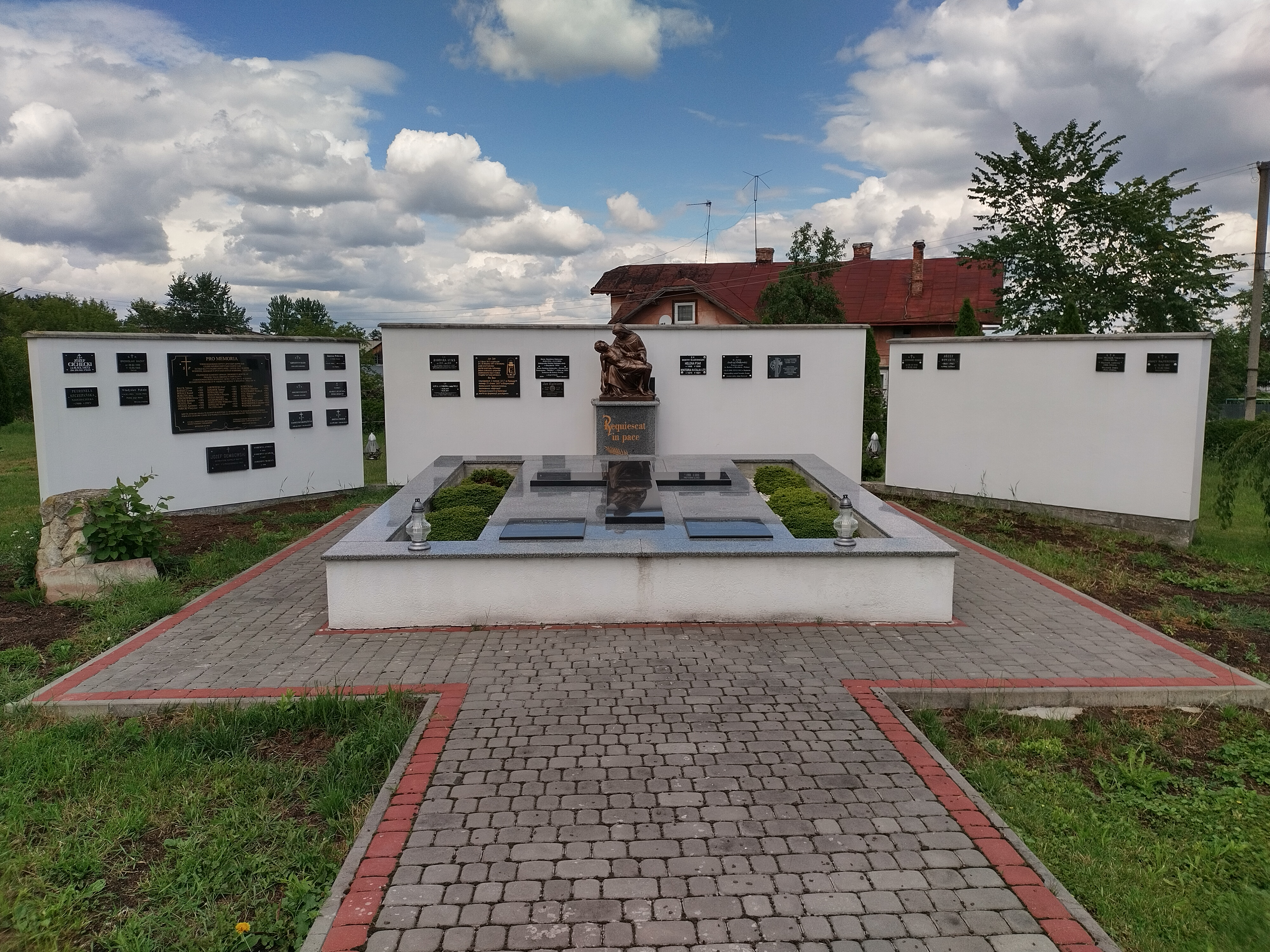
- From top, left to right: Pumpjack; Church of Saint Barbara; Church of Saint Anne; Pharmacy and Museum of Jan Zeh; War Memorial

- Flag Coat of arms
- Interactive map of Boryslav
- Location of Boryslav Boryslav (Ukraine)
- Coordinates: 49°17′21″N 23°25′08″E
- Country: Ukraine
- Oblast: Lviv Oblast
- Raion: Drohobych Raion
- Hromada: Boryslav urban hromada
- First mentioned: 1387

Government
  - Mayor: Ihor Yavorskyi

Area
  - Total: 37.0 km^{2} (14.3 sq mi)

Population (2022)
  - Total: 32,473
- Website: www.boryslavmvk.gov.ua

Boryslav (Note: Ukrainian: Борислав, IPA: [borɪˈslɑu̯]; Polish: Borysław) is a city located on the Tysmenytsia (a tributary of the Dniester), in Drohobych Raion, Lviv Oblast (region) of western Ukraine. It hosts the administration of Boryslav urban hromada, one of the hromadas of Ukraine. Boryslav is a major center of the petroleum and ozokerite industries. Population: 34,000 (2024 estimate); 32,473 (2022 estimate).

== History ==
Modern Boryslav emerged through amalgamation of four settlements: Boryslav itself, Tustanovychi, Volianka and Mraznytsia.

=== Bronze age ===
The area of the modern town of Boryslav has been inhabited at least since the Bronze Age. There are remnants of a pagan shrine from the 1st millennium BC located in the area, where approximately 270 petroglyphs are found, mostly depicting solar signs – symbols of a pre-Christian Solar deity.

=== Development of the community ===
Historical affiliations

Kingdom of Ruthenia c. 9th century–1387
Kingdom of Poland 1387–1569
Polish–Lithuanian Commonwealth 1569–1772
Habsburg monarchy 1772–1804
Austrian Empire 1804–1918
West Ukrainian People's Republic 1918-1919
Second Polish Republic 1919–1945
Soviet Union (Ukrainian SSR) 1939–1941 (occupation)
Nazi Germany 1941–1944 (occupation)
Soviet Union (Ukrainian SSR) 1944–1991
Ukraine 1991–present

Between the 9th and 13th centuries, the site of the modern town housed a fortress named Tustan, which was part of a belt of similar strongholds defending the Kievan Rus' from the west and south. After the dissolution of Kievan Rus', the town became a part of the Halych-Volhynian Principality.

With the collapse of the latter, in 1387 Boryslav became a part of the Crown of the Kingdom of Poland. In 1772, during the Partitions of Poland, it was annexed by Austria and became a part of the Austrian Kingdom of Galicia and Lodomeria.

=== Oil and ozokerite production ===
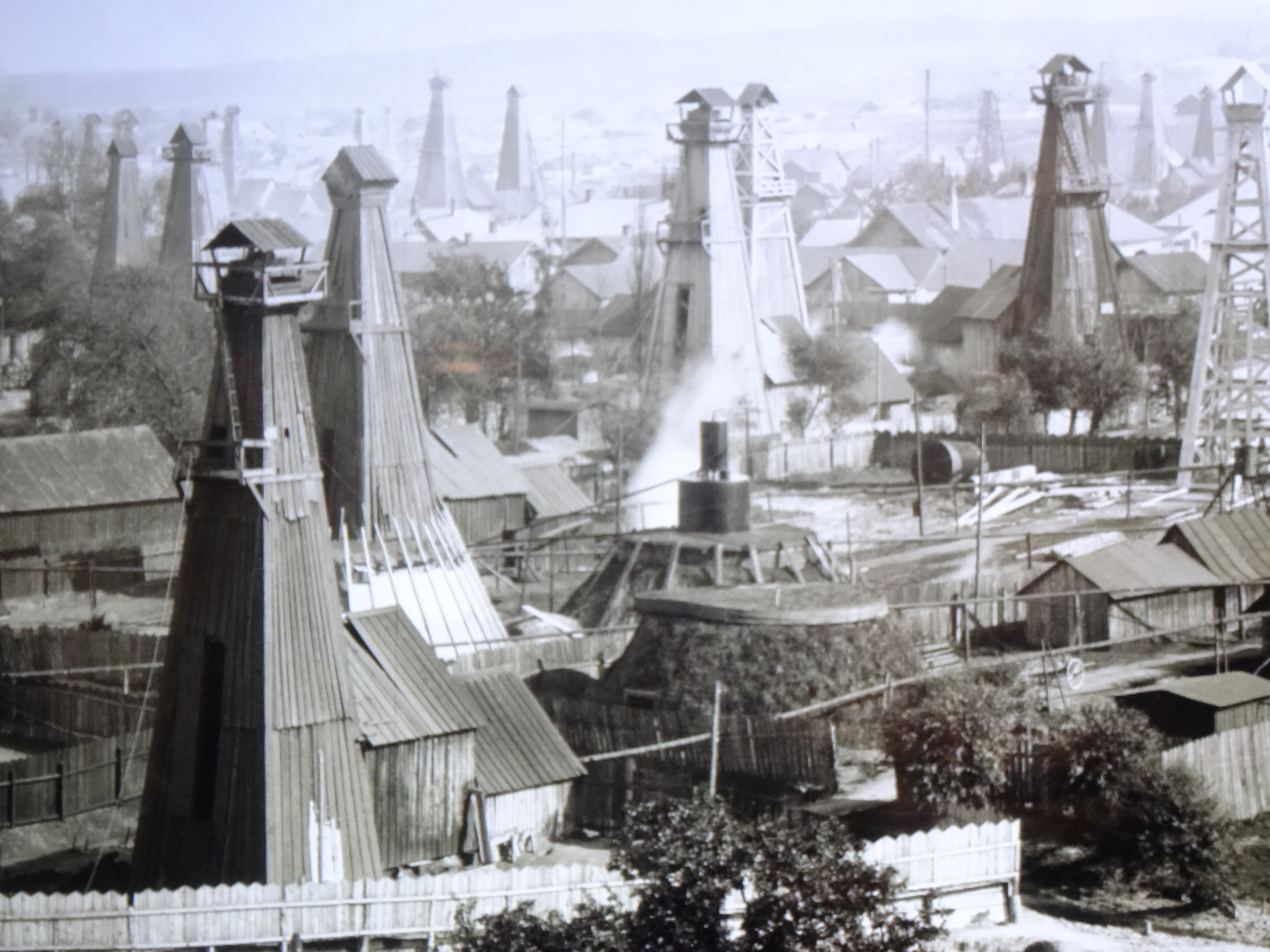
Oil wells in Borysław

During the first half of the 19th century small-scale manual production of oil started. One of the great technological developments of the 19th century was the discovery by pharmacists Jan Zeh (1817–1897) and Ignacy Łukasiewicz, in nearby Lviv, of technology that led to the establishment of a new industry based on petroleum. Scientists worked out a method of distilling Boryslaw crude oil, and on 30 March 1853 made the first kerosene lamp. As early as 31 July 1853 their new lamp was used to illuminate the Public Hospital in Lviv. Their discoveries marked the beginnings of the rapid search for petroleum in the Carpathians — especially in the eastern sector of the mountain chain where rich oil deposits were discovered.

In 1854 the first ozokerite mine was started in the town after the ore was discovered by Robert Doms. In the second half of 1853, following the research of Jan Zeh, Ignacy Łukasiewicz and several other scientists working in the nearby city of Lemberg (the then official name of Lviv), the town and its surroundings saw the emergence of an oil industry. One of the first oil rigs in the world was built near Boryslav by Robert Doms in 1861. The number of oil rigs also rose from 4,000 in 1870 to over 12,000 three years later. The oil boom drew many industry moguls from all over Austria-Hungary and many fortunes were earned and lost there. Along with ozokerite natural gas was also produced in Boryslav.

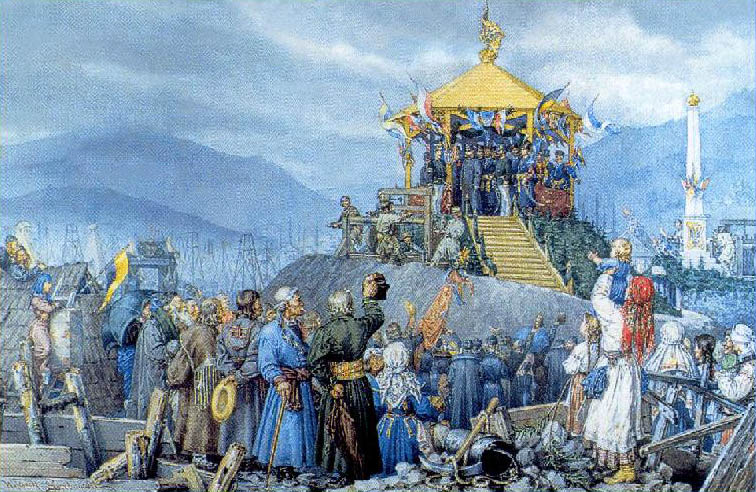
Visit of Francis Joseph I to Boryslav by Wojciech Grabowski, 1880

A period of prosperity saw the city's population grow as almost 10,000 new workers arrived to the area. In 1886 an oil mining school was opened in Borysław, one of the first such facilities in Europe. Also the ozokerite, a natural mineral wax, mined in Borysław, was used for insulation of the first trans-Atlantic telegraphic cable line. On 31 December 1872, a railway line linking Borysław with the nearby city of Drohobycz (now Drohobych, Ukraine) was opened. Between 1905 and 1909 Boryslav experienced the peak of oil production: in 1909, more than 1,920,000 tonnes of oil were produced in the region — roughly 5% of the world's oil production at that time making the region the third biggest producer of oil after the US and the Russian Empire in the world. The depth of oil wells at that time reached up to 2000 meters.

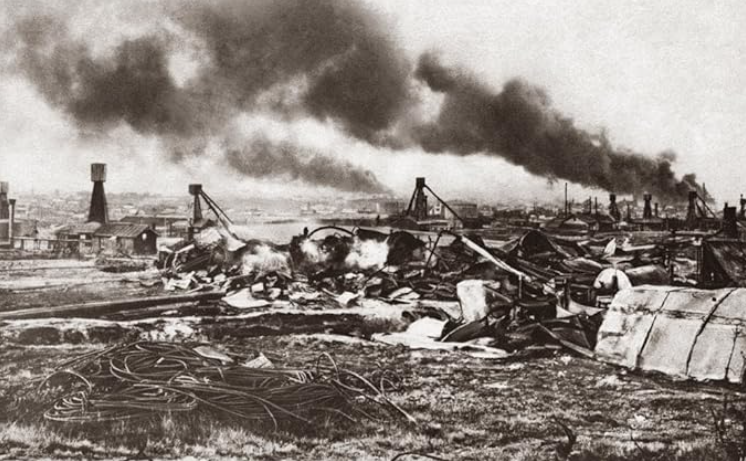
Boryslav oil wells set on fire by the Russian army, 1915

=== Poland ===
After the Great War the area became part of the new West Ukrainian People's Republic, but following the Polish-Ukrainian War of November 1918 – July 1919 Boryslav was incorporated tnto the restored Poland. In 1920 the mining school was significantly expanded and was renamed to Carpathian Geological Station, a de facto oil mining university. As the capital of the Zagłębie Borysławskie (Borysław Oil Basin), the town of Borysław was the centre of then Polish oil and ozokerite extraction industries and one of the most important industrial zones of Poland. Because of that, on 26 July 1933 the town was granted a city charter. Together with the nearby settlement of Tustanowice (Tustanovychi, now part of Boryslav), Boryslaw produced in 1925 about 80% of Polish oil (812,000 tons). Boryslav was then commonly called the "Polish Baku". In the period 1929–1936, oil extraction shrank from 511,000 to 319,000 tonnes of oil annually.

=== World War II ===
In 1939, after the Soviet invasion of Poland, the town was annexed by the Soviet Union under the terms of the Molotov–Ribbentrop Pact. Allocated to the Ukrainian SSR, it became officially known as Boryslav. In 1941, the city fell under German control upon the advances of the German army to the east at the start of Soviet–German hostilities.

==== Jewish casualties ====
About 12,500 Jewish residents lived in Boryslav at the beginning of the war. On the day following the Germans' arrival, local Ukrainians launched a pogrom, participated in by some German soldiers, that murdered approximately 350 Jews and wounded and robbed many more. The first official anti-Jewish actions began at the end of November 1941, when around 1,500 Jews, the majority of whom were deemed weak and unable to work, were shot by the Ukrainian militia and German security police in the forest near the town of Truskavets. During the winter of 1941–1942, many Jews died of hunger and disease, including typhus. In May 1942, an official ghetto was established; some Jews from neighboring towns were brought there to live. At the beginning of August 1942, Jews, including those from neighboring villages, like Pidbuzh and Skhidnytsya, were rounded up by the German police, Ukrainian Auxiliary Police, and Jewish police. Some were shot on the spot, about 400 were sent to the Janowska concentration camp near Lwów, and 5000 were sent to Belzec where they were immediately gassed.

Two separate ghettos were created in Boryslav, including one for workers in the oil industry. In October 1942, the Germans and local Ukrainians and Poles, led by German soldiers, rounded up more than 1000 Jews and sent them to Belzec to be murdered. In another action in November, about 1500 Jews were rounded up, held for three weeks under depraved conditions in a local cinema, and then sent to Belzec.

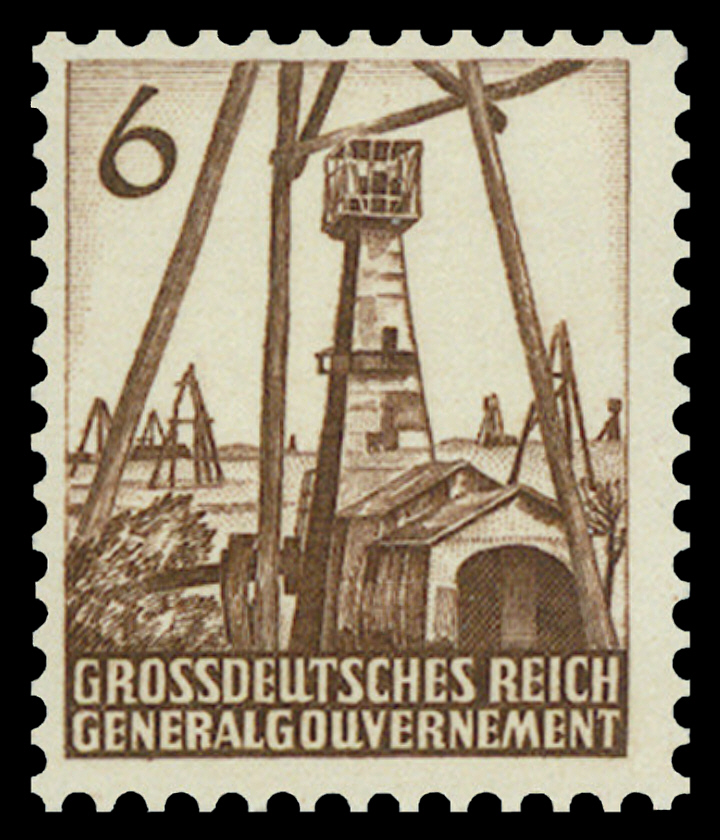
World War II German post stamp

During the fifth action in February 1943, 600 Jews were shot by members of the Ukrainian Auxiliary Police, German police, and the Schupo. The isolated executions of Jews in hiding took place all the time from May till June 1943 until the total liquidation of the Boryslav ghetto at the end of June 1943. Over the course of one week, the German forces murdered around 700 Jews (sick, young and elderly Jews and members of the Jewish Police). Other Jews were hunted down by Ukrainian and German forces and shot. The remaining Jews were deported to different labor camps (Plaszów and Mauthausen) from April to June 1944. In all, over 10,000 Jews native to Boryslaw were shot by Germans and Ukrainians or murdered in the camps.

==== Jewish lives saved ====
Despite the persecutions, between 250 and 800 Jews in Boryslav managed to survive the Nazi occupation. Among them was the family of engineer Abraham Lipman, whose wife and son were rescued by Ukrainian Greek Catholic priest Vasyl Popel (1908-1982), a godson of metropolitan bishop Andrey Sheptytsky. Popel housed the Lipmans at his family home, allowing them to eventually rejoin Abraham and flee from the city, later emigrating to Poland. Following the war Vasyl was declared "enemy of the people" by Soviet authorities and spent 11 years in labour camps of Kolyma and Kazakhstan. In 2003 Vasyl Popel, as well as his mother Motrona (1870-1962) and wife Stefania (1919-1995) were recognized as Righteous Among the Nations by the Yad Vashem memorial centre.

Some Jews escaped and formed partisan units in the forests. Resistance groups in the ghetto obtained some arms and set fire to some raw materials in ghetto industry. The manager of the German Karpathen oil company, Berthold Beitz, and his wife Else Beitz rescued about 250 people in one day when he had them pulled off a train at Boryslav who were headed for the Belzec extermination camp in July 1942. Beitz had also helped adults and children escape across the Hungarian border. Saying that the Jewish people were crucial to oil production during the war, Berthold and Else rescued about 800 people between 1941 and 1944. Berthold and Else Beitz were recognized as Righteous among the Nations by Yad Vashem. Another family awarded that title was the Miniv family from Boryslav.

For a description of the events in Boryslav during the war, see the Encyclopedia of Camps and Ghettos. A personal-account history of this period is recounted by the Polish-American writer — and Boryslav native — Wilhelm Dichter in his popular and acclaimed literary debut, Koń Pana Boga. It is a memoir of the war in Borsylav as Dichter experienced it as a Polish-Jewish child.

=== After World War II ===
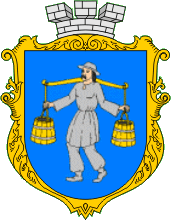
Coat of arms in 1996–2012

Following Germany's defeat in World War II, the town came again under Soviet rule. Most local Poles were expelled to Poland, with a sizeable group settling in Wałbrzych, now a twin town of Boryslav. During the Soviet era Boryslav produced 80% of all oil in Ukrainian Carpathians. An oil distillery, plants producing machinery for oil industry, ozokerite, candle, lubricant and gum factories were operating along with several technial schools and a geological institute.

Since 1991, the town has been part of independent Ukraine. The oil industry remains operating. Experts believe that potential oil fields around Boryslav contain far more stocks.

Until 18 July 2020, Boryslav was designated as a city of oblast significance and belonged to Boryslav Municipality. As part of the administrative reform of Ukraine, which reduced the number of raions of Lviv Oblast to seven, Boryslav Municipality was merged into Drohobych Raion.

== Demographics ==
Historical population
Year	Pop.	±%
1880	15,500	—
1921	16,099	+3.9%
1931	41,683	+158.9%
2022	32,473	−22.1%

Between 1880 and 1931 the population of Boryslav increased almost threefold, with the proportion of Ukrainians and Jews declining from 28 to 23% and from 62% to 28% respectively, meanwhile the percentage of Poles increased from 10% to 48%.

== In culture ==
Ukrainian writer and poet Ivan Franko dedicated his novel Boryslav Laughs to the workers' movement of the town's oil refinery workers, who organized the first strike in Ukrainian history.

== Landmarks and visitor attractions ==
- Tustan fortress, a historic-cultural preserve
- Skole Beskids, a National Park

== International relations ==
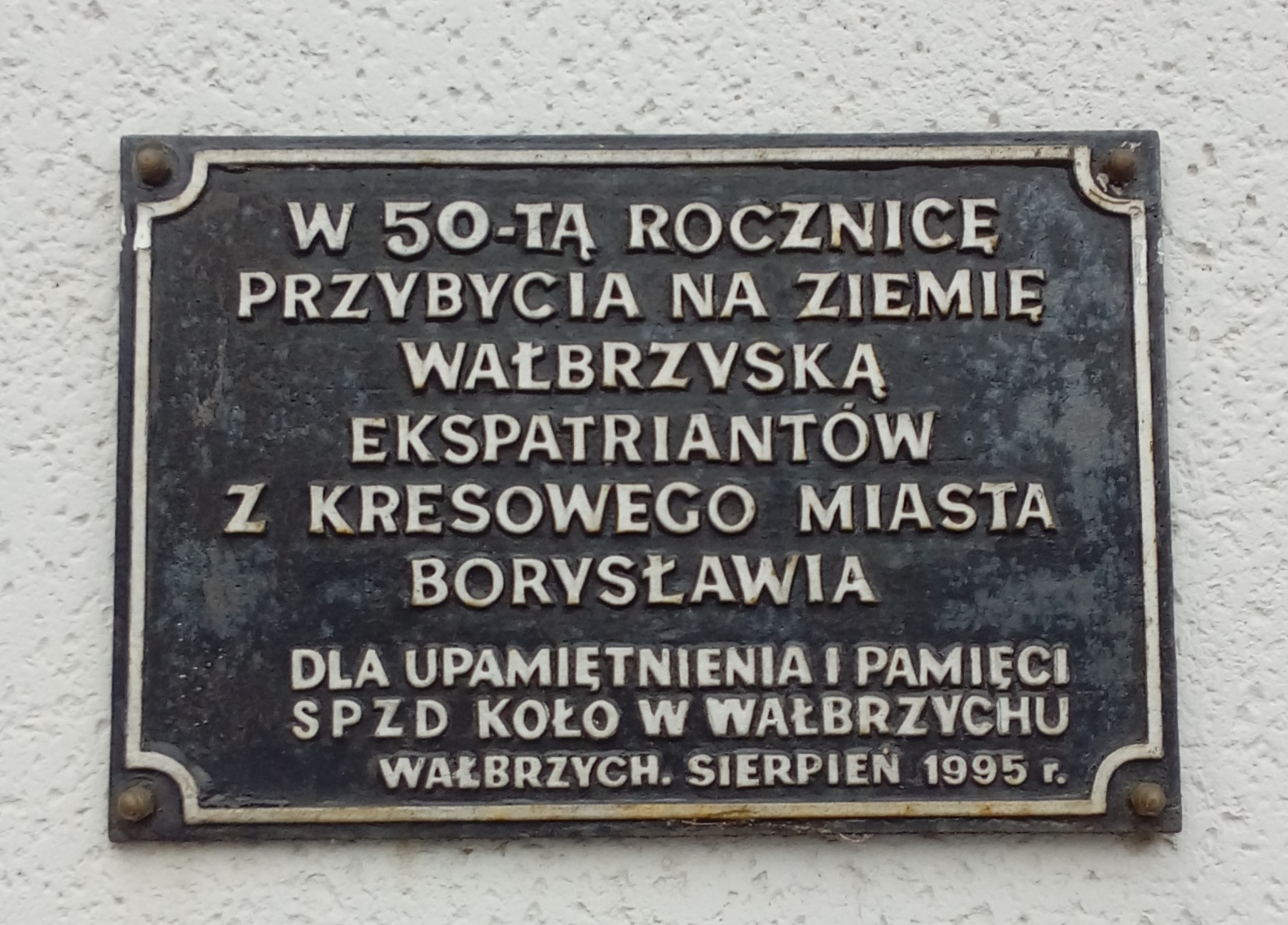
Memorial in Wałbrzych to Poles resettled from Boryslav to Wałbrzych

=== Twin town – sister city ===
Boryslav is twinned with:

- Wałbrzych in Poland (since 27 February 2009)

== Notable people ==
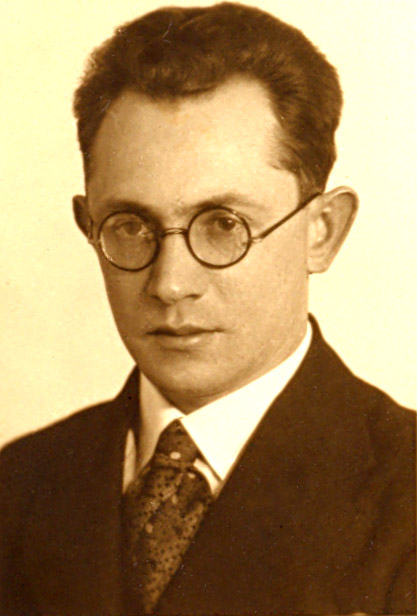
Mykhailo Dragan

- Michael Sobell (1892–1993), British businessman and philanthropist
- Mykhailo Dragan (1899–1952), Ukrainian art historian, born in Tustanovychi
- Isaac Houser (1899–?), grandfather of Grand Theft Auto producer Sam Houser
- José Maurer (1906-1968), stage and cinema actor starring mainly in the Yiddish theatre in Europe, Argentina and Israel
- Zdzisław Żygulski, Jr. (1921–2015), Polish art historian and professor of the Academy of Fine Arts in Kraków
- Wladyslaw Nehrebecki (1923–1978), a Polish animator and cartoon director, creator of Bolek and Lolek
- Vira Vovk (1926–2022), Ukrainian poet
- Sabina Wolanski (1927–2011), Holocaust survivor
- Wilhelm Dichter (born 1935), engineer, Holocaust survivor and writer
- Shevah Weiss (1935–2023), Israeli politician

== Gallery ==
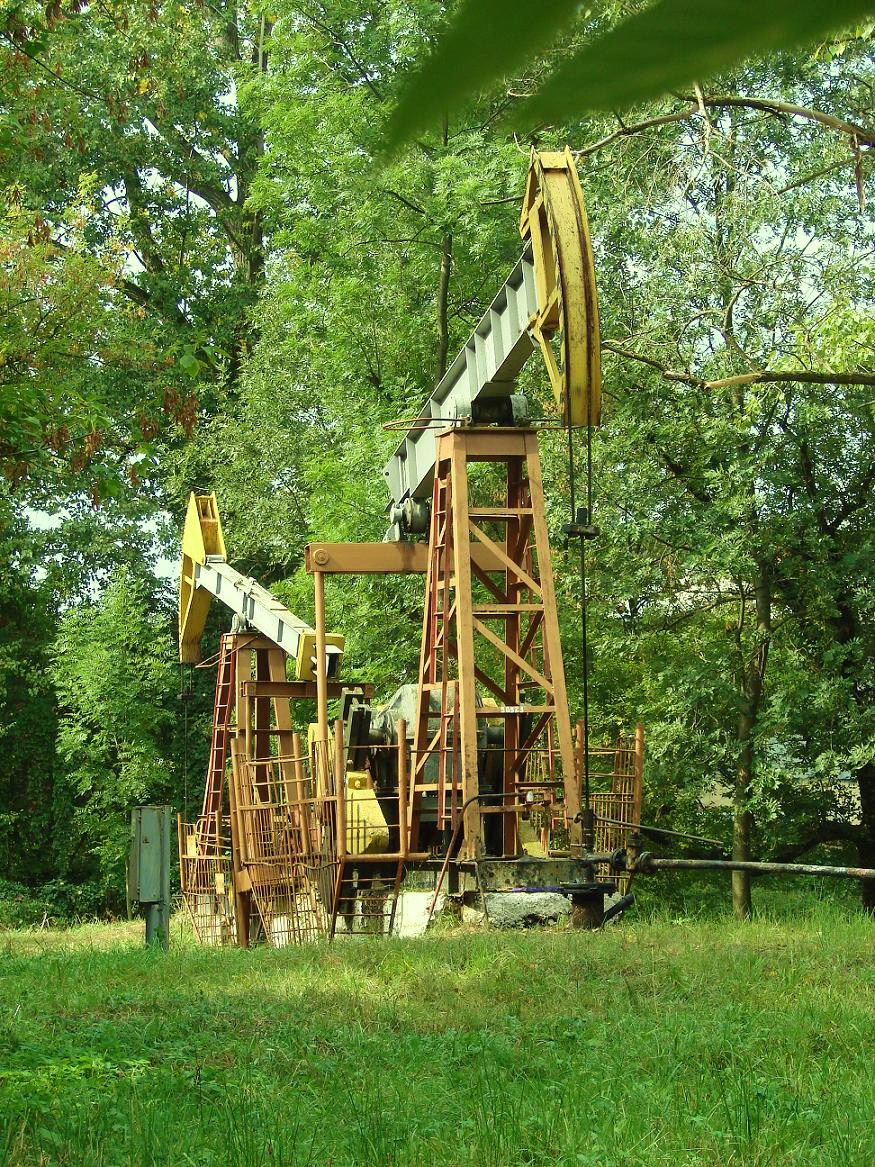
Oil pumps in the Boryslav city park, 2009

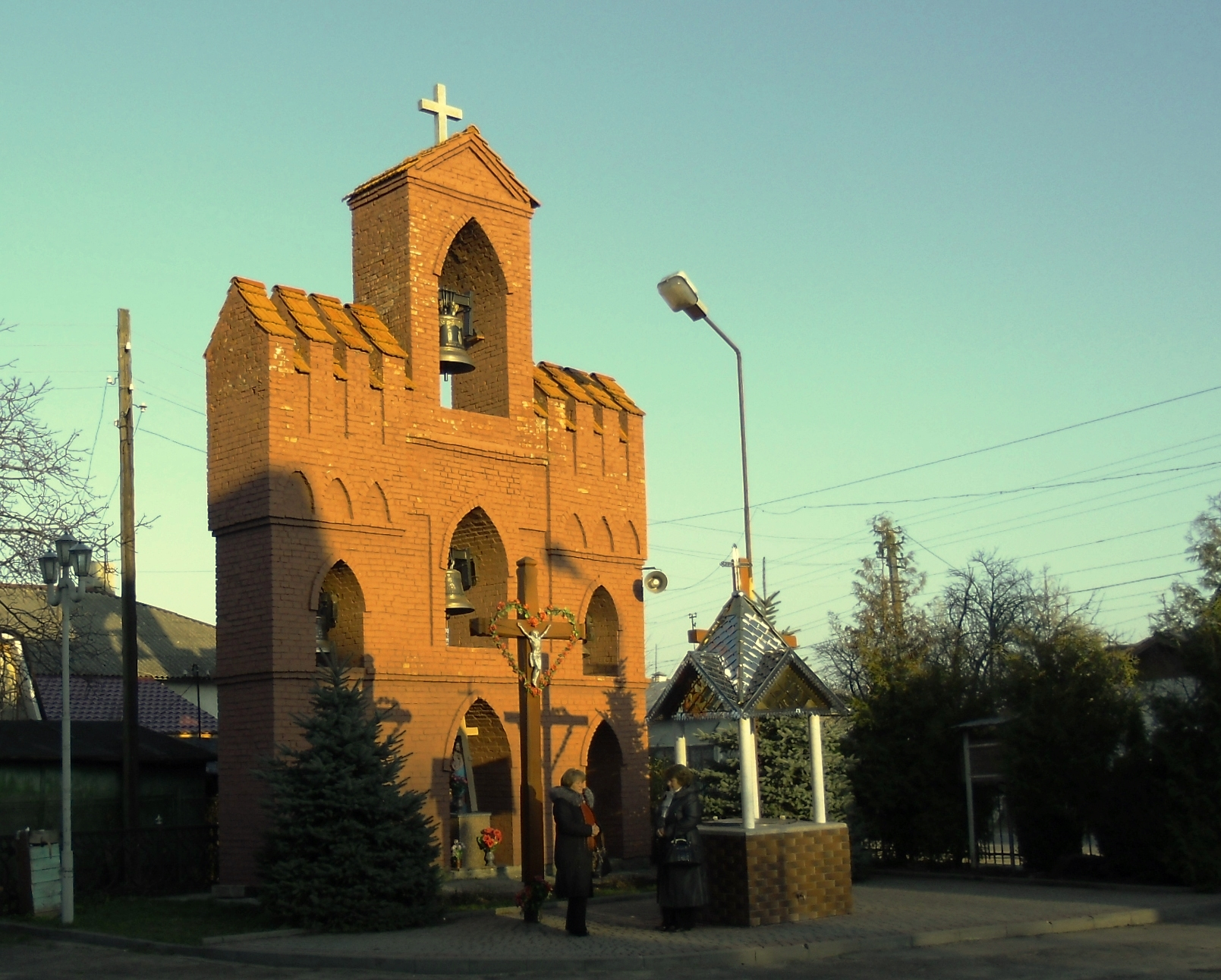
The bell tower of the Church of St. Anne

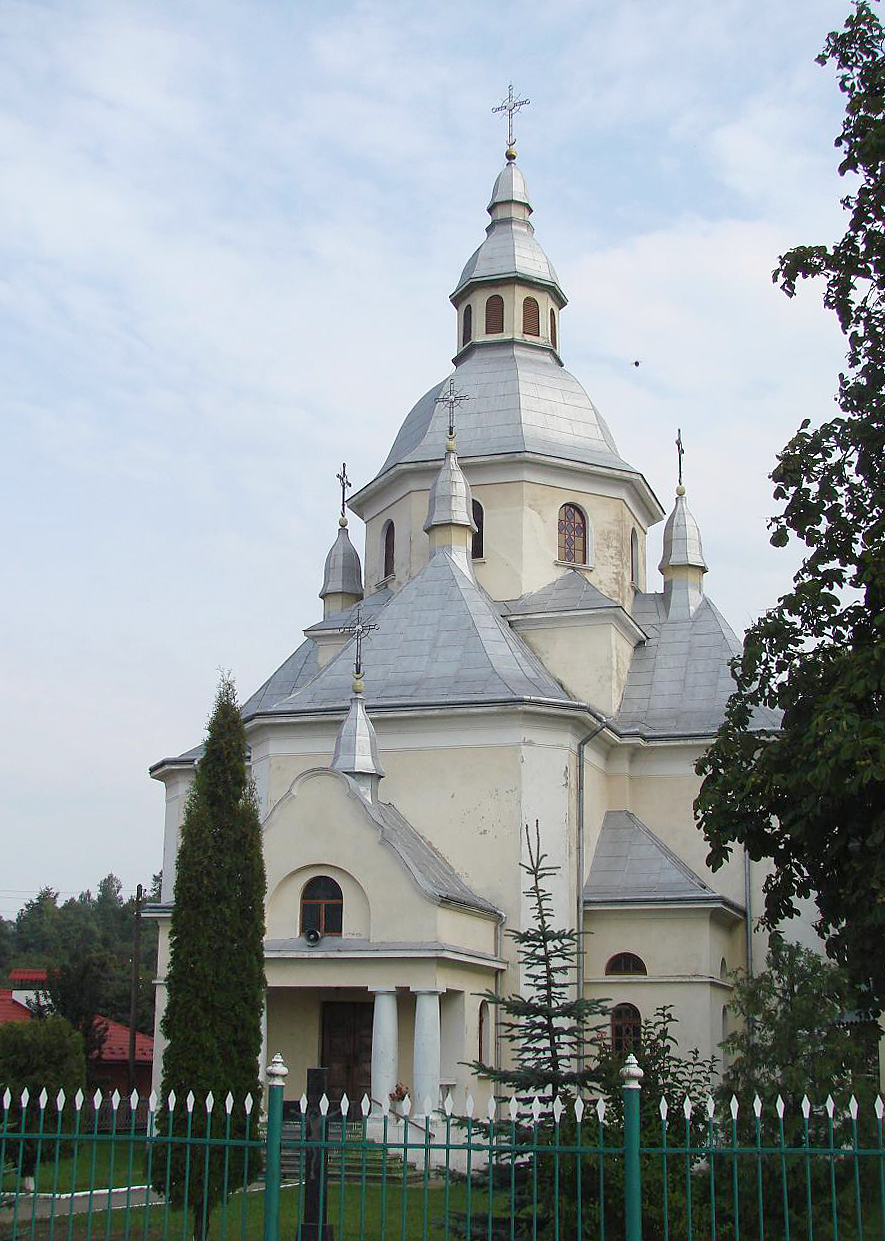
Assumption Church

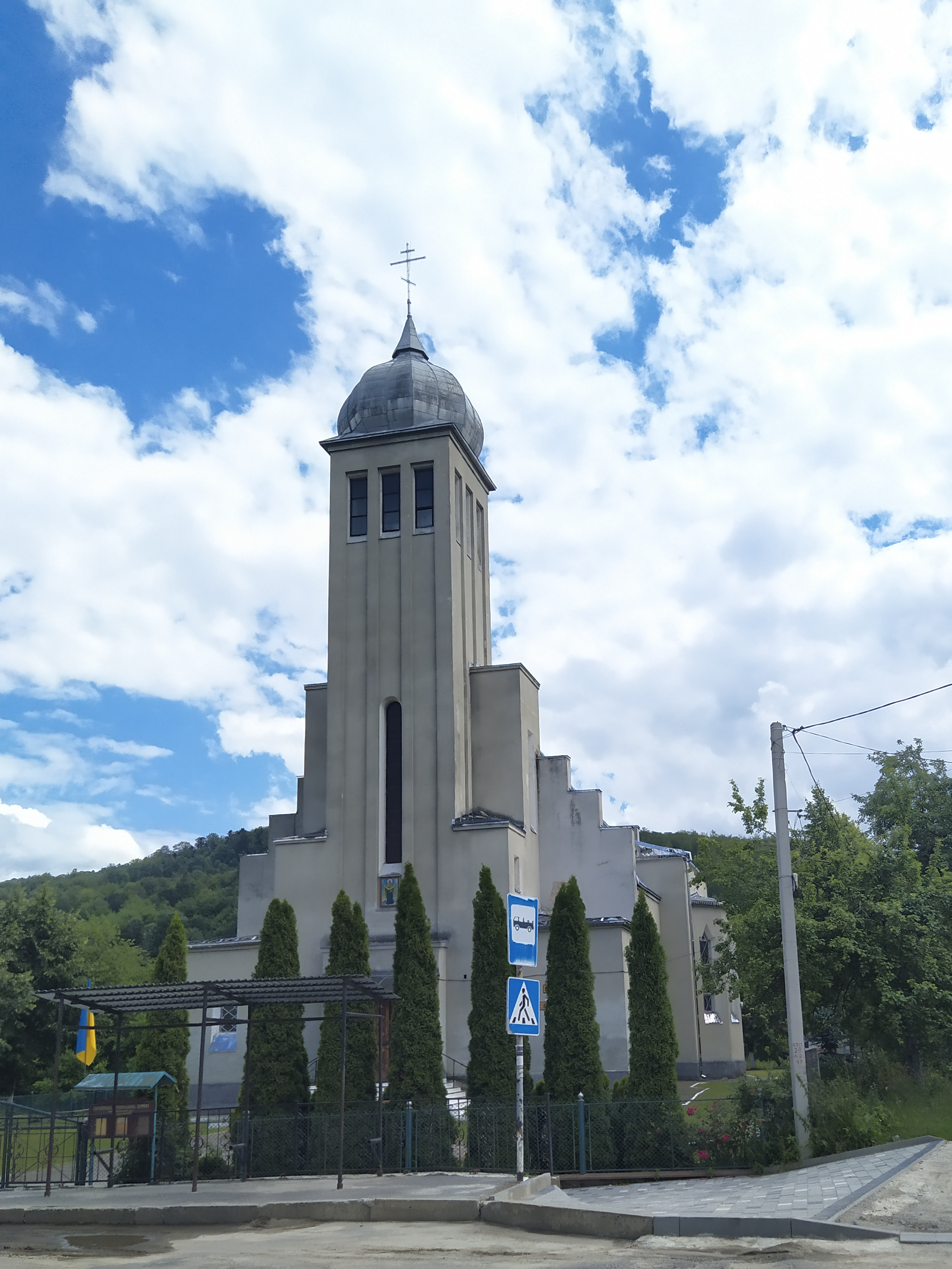
Intercession Church

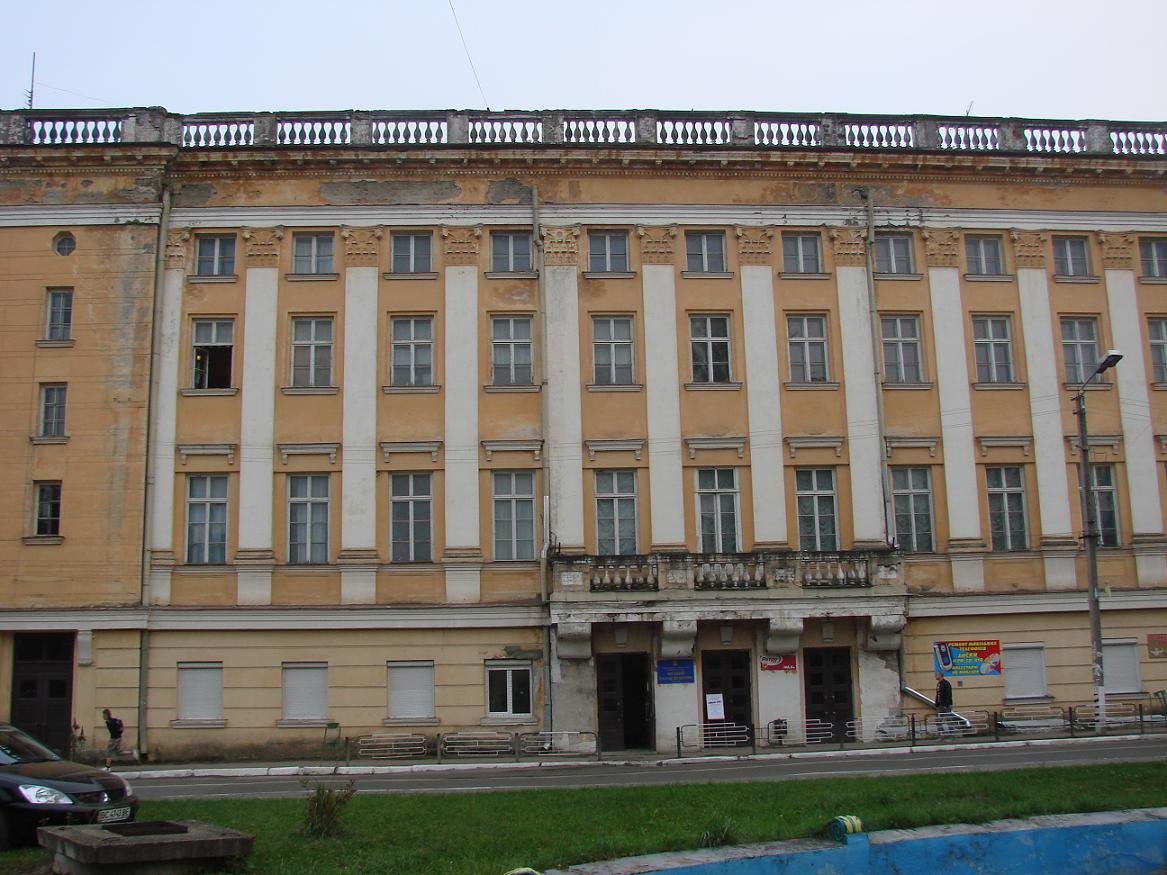
Polish-built Palace of Culture for Oilers, 2009

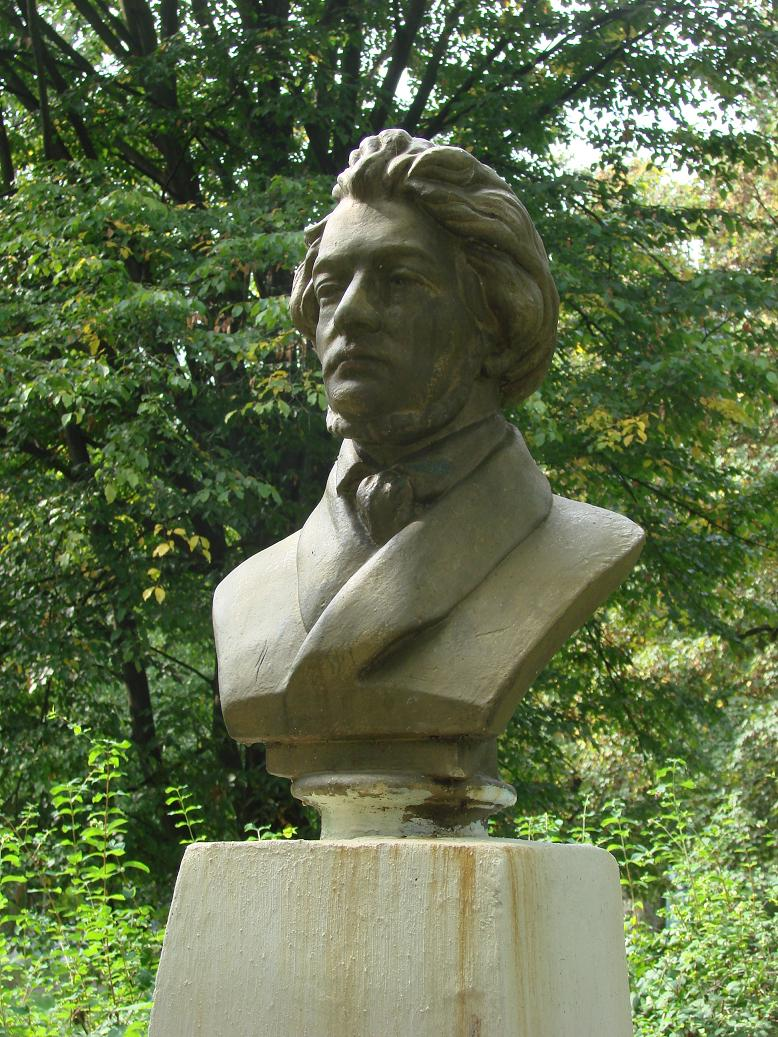
Bust of Adam Mickiewicz

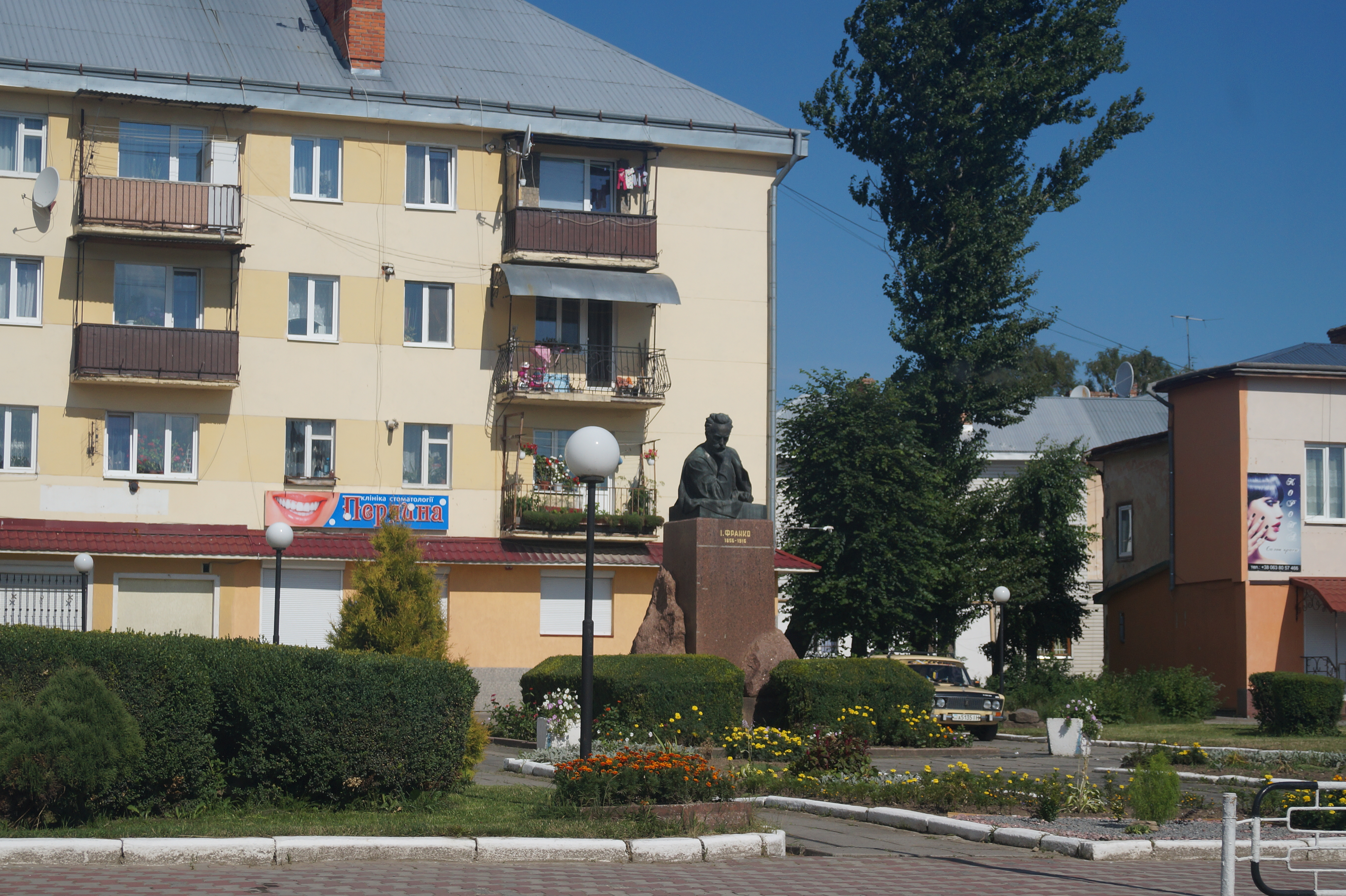
Ivan Franko monument

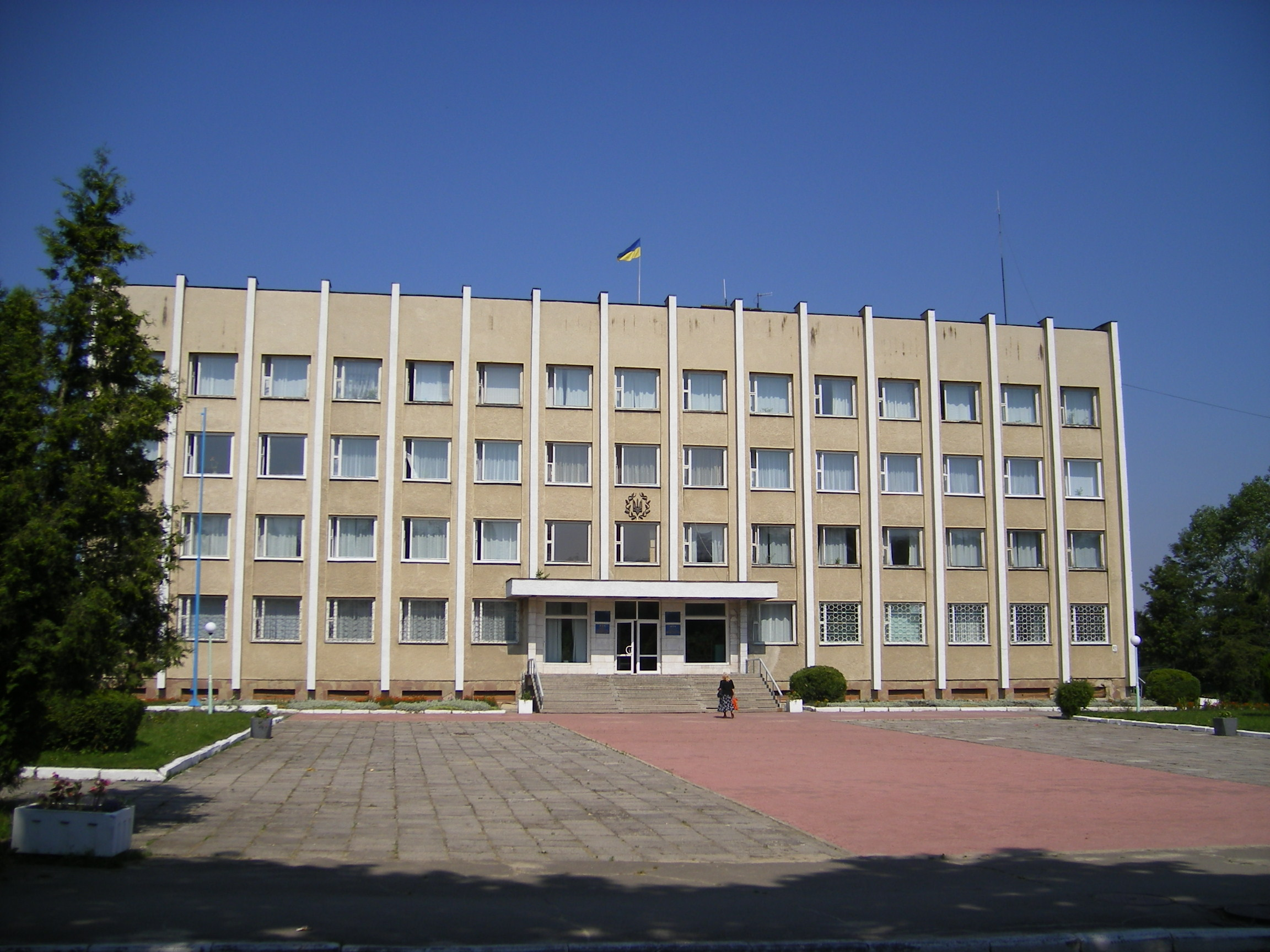
City administration building, 2006
