= Goldenstädt =

- Ortsteil of Banzkow
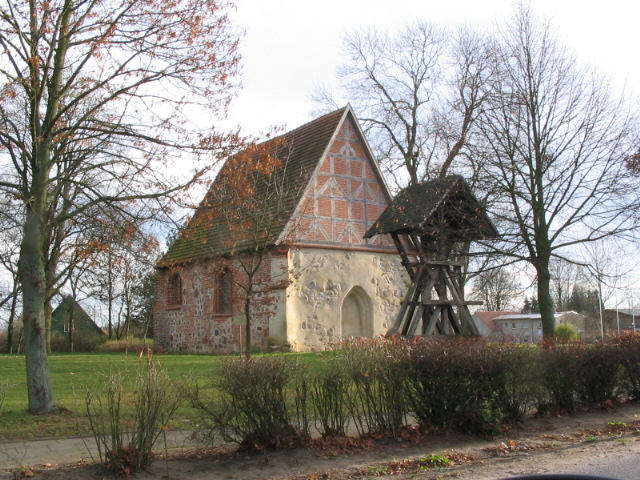
- Church
- Interactive map of Goldenstädt
- Location within Germany Location within Mecklenburg-Vorpommern
- Coordinates: 53°28′N 11°31′E
- Country: Germany
- State: Mecklenburg-Vorpommern
- District: Ludwigslust-Parchim
- Town: Banzkow
- Subdivisions: 2 Ortsteile

Area
  - Total: 24.02 km^{2} (9.27 sq mi)
- Elevation: 29 m (95 ft)

Population (2006-12-31)
  - Total: 653
  - Density: 27.2/km^{2} (70.4/sq mi)
- Time zone: UTC+01:00 (CET)
  - Summer (DST): UTC+02:00 (CEST)
- Postal codes: 19079
- Dialling codes: 03868
- Vehicle registration: PCH
- Website: www.goldenstaedt.de

Goldenstädt is a village and a former municipality in the Ludwigslust-Parchim district, in Mecklenburg-Vorpommern, Germany. Since 7 June 2009, it is part of the municipality Banzkow.
