= Solveig Leo =

German farmer and politician

Mayor of Banzkow
- In office 1992–2009

Personal details
- Born: November 1943 (age 82) Reichsgau Sudetenland, Nazi Germany
- Party: The Left (2007-present); Party of Democratic Socialism (Germany) (1990-2007); SED (1965-1989)
- Education: University of Rostock
- Occupation: Farm manager, politician
- Awards: Order of Merit of the Federal Republic of Germany; Hero of Labour; Order of Merit of Mecklenburg-Vorpommern

Solveig Leo (born November 1943) is a German farmer and politician who served as Mayor of Banzkow from 1992 to 2009.

== Biography ==
Leo was born in 1943 in Nazi-occupied Sudetenland. In the aftermath of the war, she and her family were relocated to Thuringia, which was located in the newly formed German Democratic Republic. She completed her apprenticeship as a farmer at the VEG Ludwigshof, which was followed by studies at the Technical School of Agriculture in Weimar. At an agricultural exhibition in Leipzig, her talents were recognized by the Chairman of the LPG Banzkow, who recruited her, and she relocated to Bezirk Schwerin. She joined the Socialist Unity Party of Germany (SED) in 1965 and in January 1968, at just 24 years old and already married with children, she was elected Chairwoman of the LPG 'Clara Zetkin'. She instantly achieved celebrity status in the country, and she was considered a prototype of the modern, young East German woman. In addition to her duties as a farm chairperson and mother, she was a distance learning student at the University of Rostock and a member of the district management of the Free German Youth in Schwerin. In 1969, Leo was awarded the title Hero of Labour. In 1971, she was elected to the Central Council of the Free German Youth, a position she held for many years. As agriculture became more centralized in East Germany, Leo was elected chairwoman of the new Agricultural-Industrial Association Lewitz, a state-run collective that contained twelve LPGs and three VEGs, a total of 31,000 hectares of agricultural land. Following German reunification, Leo worked as an organic farming consultant and was elected Mayor of Banzkow in 1992 as a member of the Party of Democratic Socialism, the successor party of the SED. She held the mayoral office until her retirement in 2009. In April 2001, she was awarded the Order of Merit of the Federal Republic of Germany.
