= Tutow =

- Municipality
- Location of Tutow within Vorpommern-Greifswald district
- Interactive map of Tutow
- Location within Germany Location within Mecklenburg-Vorpommern
- Coordinates: 53°55′N 13°16′E
- Country: Germany
- State: Mecklenburg-Vorpommern
- District: Vorpommern-Greifswald
- Municipal assoc.: Jarmen-Tutow

Government
  - Mayor: Hans-Peter Littmann

Area
  - Total: 6.05 km^{2} (2.34 sq mi)
- Elevation: 14 m (46 ft)

Population (2025-12-31)
  - Total: 979
  - Density: 162/km^{2} (419/sq mi)
- Time zone: UTC+01:00 (CET)
  - Summer (DST): UTC+02:00 (CEST)
- Postal codes: 17129
- Dialling codes: 039999
- Vehicle registration: DM
- Website: www.jarmen.de

Tutow is a municipality in the Vorpommern-Greifswald district, in Mecklenburg-Vorpommern, Germany.

In 1934, the German air force created its first group of Fighter Squadron 152 in Tutow, and built a command center.

In January 1939, the Donau-Zeitung reported about the Kampffliegerschule (Tutow Air War School).
