= Order of Merit of Mecklenburg-Vorpommern =

Order of Merit of Mecklenburg-Vorpommern Verdienstorden des Landes Mecklenburg-Vorpommern
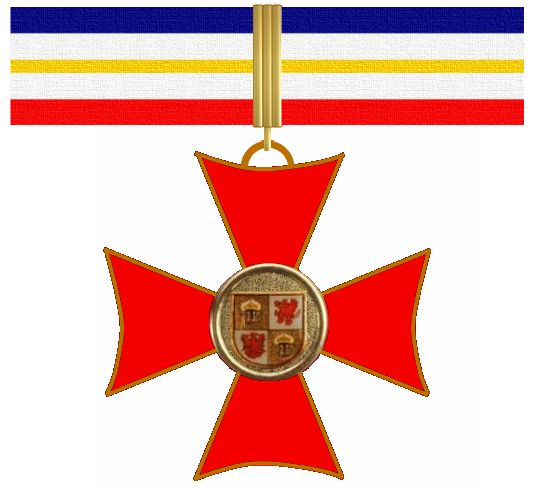
- Badge and ribbon of the order

Awarded by the Minister-President of Mecklenburg-Vorpommern
- Type: Civil order of merit
- Established: 23 April 2001
- Country: Germany
- Awarded for: Outstanding service to the state of Mecklenburg-Vorpommern
- Grand Master: Manuela Schwesig
- Grades: Member
- Ribbon bar of the order

The Order of Merit of Mecklenburg-Vorpommern (German: Verdienstorden des Landes Mecklenburg-Vorpommern) is a civil order of merit, and the highest award of the German State of Mecklenburg-Vorpommern. The award is presented to men and women for exceptional performance over a long period of time, or an extraordinary individual performance for the benefit of Mecklenburg-Vorpommern. Founded in 2001 and first presented in 2002, the order may be presented to up to 20 persons per year.

== Notable recipients ==
- Reinhart Kny, President of FC Anker Wismar
- Horst Klinkmann
- Berthold Beitz
- Solveig Leo
