= Völschow =

- Municipality
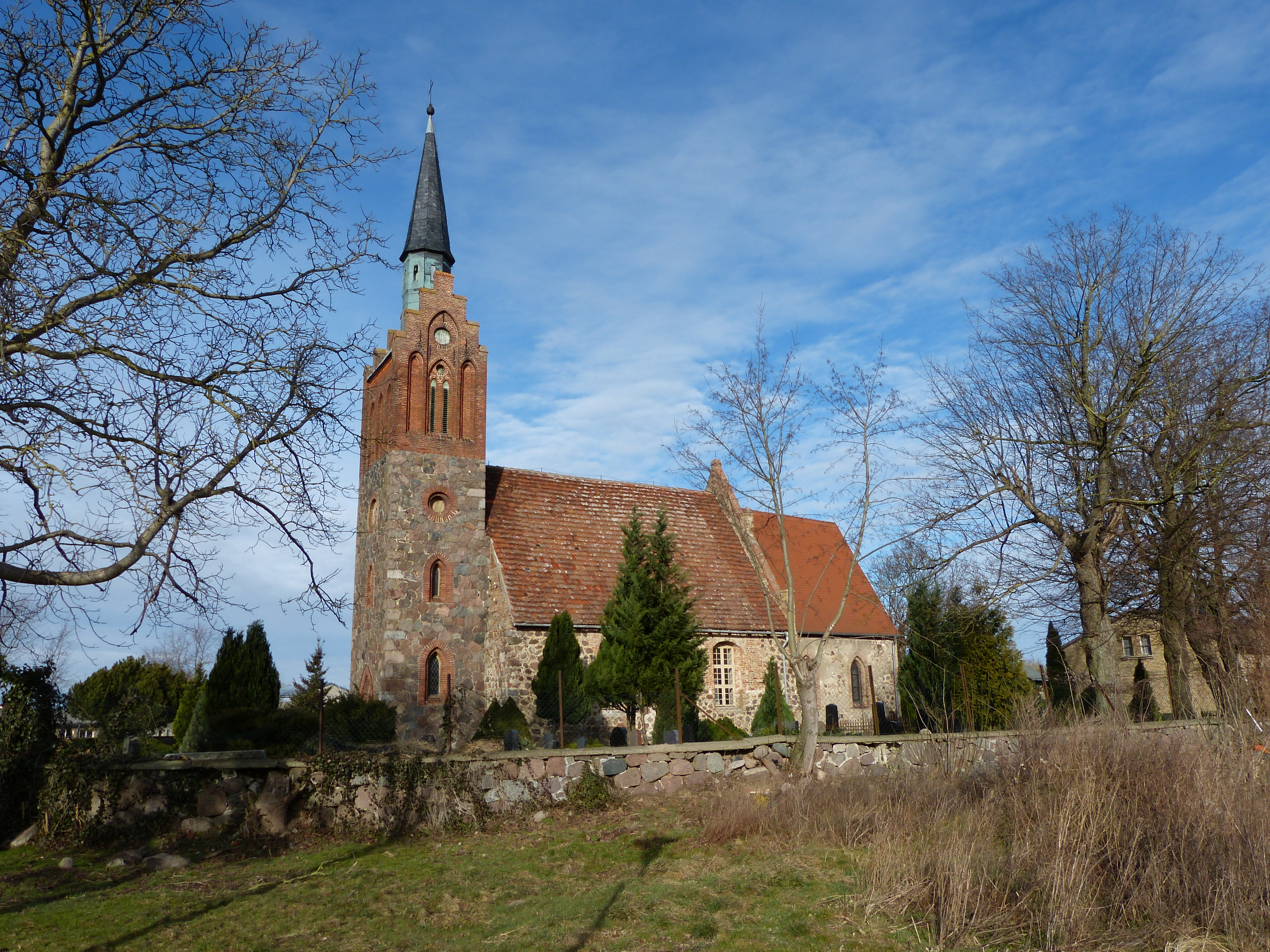
- Village church in Völschow

- Location of Völschow within Vorpommern-Greifswald district
- Interactive map of Völschow
- Location within Germany Location within Mecklenburg-Vorpommern
- Coordinates: 53°52′N 13°19′E
- Country: Germany
- State: Mecklenburg-Vorpommern
- District: Vorpommern-Greifswald
- Municipal assoc.: Jarmen-Tutow
- Subdivisions: 4

Government
  - Mayor: Hans-Ulrich Saß

Area
  - Total: 21.68 km^{2} (8.37 sq mi)
- Elevation: 12 m (39 ft)

Population (2025-12-31)
  - Total: 523
  - Density: 24.1/km^{2} (62.5/sq mi)
- Time zone: UTC+01:00 (CET)
  - Summer (DST): UTC+02:00 (CEST)
- Postal codes: 17129
- Dialling codes: 039997
- Vehicle registration: DM
- Website: www.jarmen.de

Völschow is a municipality in the Vorpommern-Greifswald district, in Mecklenburg-Vorpommern, Germany. It is located 42 km north of Neubrandenburg and 26 km south of Greifswald.
