= Wilhelm Dichter =

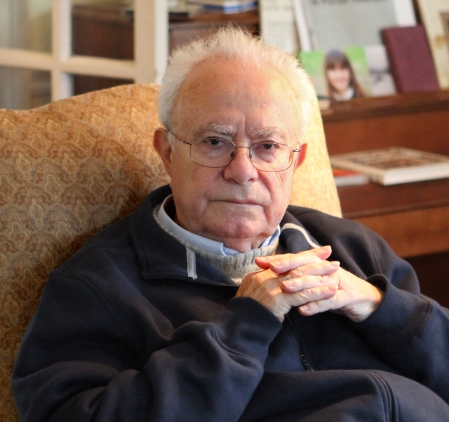
- Wilhelm Dichter in 2011
- Born: October 25, 1935 (age 90); Borysław, Second Polish Republic (present day Ukraine)
- Citizenship: American
- Occupation: Novelist

Wilhelm Dichter (born 25 October 1935) is a Polish American writer and the author of three novels based on his life.

== Biography ==
Dichter was born in 1935 in Borysław (in modern-day Ukraine), where he survived the war. His father had died, and he and his mother (remarried after the war) came to live in Poland toward the end of 1944. He finished his studies at the Warsaw Polytechnic, where he earned his doctorate in mechanical engineering and worked until 1968. The antisemitic campaign that year in Poland provided the opportunity for him and his family to emigrate, through Vienna and Rome, eventually settling in the United States. As an expert in ballistics, he worked at Colt Firearms in the R&D division and later in Hartford, Connecticut. In 1978, he became an image processing algorithm design specialist at the Linotype-Hell company. He and his wife Olga live in the Boston area.

== Works ==
In 1996, the author's literary debut, God's Horse (Polish: Koń Pana Boga) was nominated for the Nike, Poland's top literary award. The book, an autobiographical, literary novel traces the life of the author from early childhood as he miraculously survives the Holocaust. The book is written without sentimentality and from the perspective of the child that he was at the time. It is simple and concise, and its literary style has been likened to that of Ernest Hemingway. The book soon became required reading for high school students in Poland.

Dichter's second book, The Atheists' School (Szkoła Bezbożników), published in 2000, follows the author's life after the war in the newly established Communist Poland. It is a story of the coming of age of a young man in a culture that promises a bright new future. We follow as he experiences his life in an elite, secular high school, falls in love and is conflicted with adopting a life ideology. It was also a finalist for the Nike Award.

In 2012, both novels, God's Horse and The Atheists' School, were published in English for the first time, translated by Madeline Levine, professor emeritus from the University of North Carolina at Chapel Hill.

His third book, Learning English (Polish: Lekcja Angielskiego) begins with the chaos of emigration from Poland and tells of the creation of and adjustment to a new life for him and his family in the United States. It was released in Poland to critical acclaim in the second half of 2010. The translation of this book is currently under way.

Dichter's books, particularly the first two, have been translated into Russian, French, Czech, German, Swedish, and Dutch.

He also wrote "The Island of Physics", which has not been translated.

== Bibliography ==
- Wyspy Fizyki (Polish) (Islands of Physics and Other Stories) (1967), co-authored with Jacek Kunicki
- God's Horse (Polish, Czech, Russian, Hebrew, Swedish, German, French, Dutch, English) (1996)
- The Atheists' School (Polish, German, English) (2000)
- Lekcja Angielskiego (Polish) (Learning English) (2010)
- God's Horse and The Atheists' School (published in English) (2012)
