= Banzkow =

- Municipality
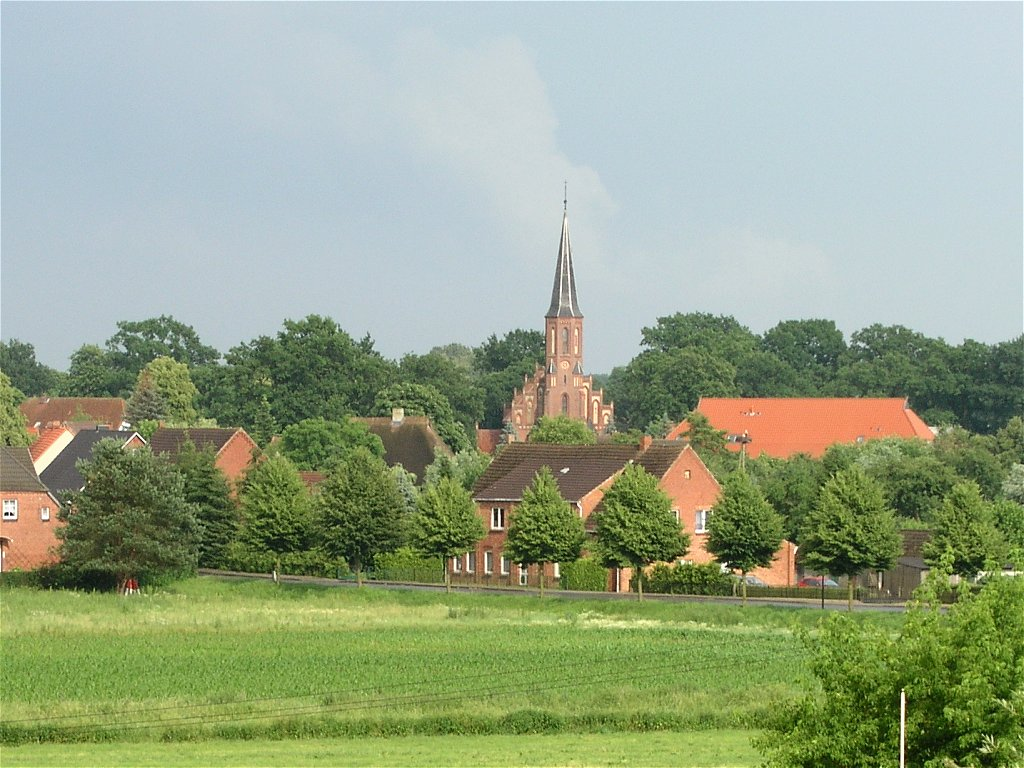
- View from the West

- Coat of arms

- Location of Banzkow within Ludwigslust-Parchim district
- Interactive map of Banzkow
- Location within Germany Location within Mecklenburg-Vorpommern
- Coordinates: 53°31′N 11°31′E
- Country: Germany
- State: Mecklenburg-Vorpommern
- District: Ludwigslust-Parchim
- Municipal assoc.: Crivitz
- Subdivisions: 2

Government
  - Mayor: Guido Klüver (Ind.)

Area
  - Total: 52.28 km^{2} (20.19 sq mi)
- Elevation: 38 m (125 ft)

Population (2025-12-31)
  - Total: 2,610
  - Density: 49.9/km^{2} (129/sq mi)
- Time zone: UTC+01:00 (CET)
  - Summer (DST): UTC+02:00 (CEST)
- Postal codes: 19079
- Dialling codes: 03861, 03868
- Vehicle registration: LUP, HGN, LBZ, LWL, PCH, STB
- Website: Gemeinde Banzkow

Banzkow is a municipality in the Ludwigslust-Parchim district, in Mecklenburg-Vorpommern, Germany. Since 2009 it has included Goldenstädt.

From 1992 to 2009 Solveig Leo, who achieved celebrity status as the youngest LPG chairperson in East Germany, served as Mayor of Banzkow, representing the Party of Democratic Socialism and later The Left.

The toponym of this settlement was recorded as Bancekowe in the year 1300.
