= Jarmen-Tutow =

Amt in Mecklenburg-Vorpommern, Germany

- Amt
- Location of Jarmen-Tutow within Vorpommern-Greifswald district
- Interactive map of Jarmen-Tutow
- Location within Germany Location within Mecklenburg-Vorpommern
- Coordinates: 53°55′N 13°21′E
- Country: Germany
- State: Mecklenburg-Vorpommern
- District: Vorpommern-Greifswald
- Seat: Jarmen
- Subdivisions: 7 municipalities

Area
  - Total: 172.66 km^{2} (66.66 sq mi)

Population (2025-12-31)
  - Total: 6,405
  - Density: 37.10/km^{2} (96.08/sq mi)
- Time zone: UTC+01:00 (CET)
  - Summer (DST): UTC+02:00 (CEST)
- Website: www.jarmen.de

Jarmen-Tutow is an Amt in the Vorpommern-Greifswald district, in Mecklenburg-Vorpommern, Germany. The seat of the Amt is in Jarmen.

== Municipalities ==
The Amt Jarmen-Tutow consists of the following municipalities:

1. Alt Tellin
2. Bentzin
3. Daberkow
4. Jarmen
5. Kruckow
6. Tutow
7. Völschow
