= Else Beitz =

German scholar and Holocaust hero (1920–2014)

- Born: Else Hochheim; 1920; Hamburg, Germany
- Died: September 14, 2014 (aged 93–94); Essen, North Rhine-Westphalia, Germany
- Known for: Saving about 800 Jewish people with her husband during World War II

Else Beitz (née Hochheim; 1920 – September 14, 2014), the wife of industrialist Berthold Beitz, helped conceal and feed Jewish people during World War II, which earned her several awards, including the Righteous Among the Nations. She was a German scholar who studied and published a book about industrial education.

== Personal life and education ==
Else Hochheim was born in Hamburg, Germany in 1920, the daughter of August Hochheim. As a child, she played the piano and was interested in having a good education. The family went through a difficult financial period when August was unemployed. Else's brother was taken out of school so that he could help support the family. Else's mother insisted that the children should be treated equally. Else was pulled out of school against the pleas of her teachers who found her to be intelligent. Throughout her life, Else was interested in history, literature, and music.

In May 1938, Berthold Beitz arrived in Hamburg, and Else met him at Deutsche Shell, where they both worked. They played tennis together on the company's tennis courts. Beitz and Berthold married in Hamburg on December 30, 1939, and had three daughters. They initially had a premature set of twins. Within a few weeks of her birth, Ingrid died of pneumonia. Barbara survived. Berthold, who transferred to Krosno as a manager at Beskydy oil, got a job as a secretary for Beitz, which allowed her to get a residency permit. Their daughter Barbara stayed in Greifswald with her grandmother Erna. The family — Beitz, Berthold, and Barbara — settled in the Boryslav of what was then the Ukrainian Soviet Socialist Republic. Beitz, no longer employed, focused on taking care of her family. Beitz witnessed the horror of the war. Beitz and her husband also had daughters Suzanne and Bettina.

== World War II ==
Jewish people began coming to their house in Boryslav asking for help. Beitz was most concerned about the fate of Jewish children. One family brought their son to be held at Beitz's house during the day, until he stopped coming. Beitz assumed the worst.

The Nazi regime had a hard time securing oil during the war. Berthold, the commercial manager of the Karpathen-Oil AG in the Boryslav area of Poland, began saving Jews. He declared each person he saved as indispensable for oil production during the war. Some of the people had experience working in the oil industry, others were unqualified people that were hired for their protection. In the process, he issued false work papers. If he had not saved the Jewish people, they would have been put on trains at Boryslav, destined for extermination camps.

Throughout their efforts from 1941 to 1944, Beitz was Berthold's partner and confidant. Beitz provided the Jews with food and she concealed Jews in a safe hiding place in their house. The actions that Beitz and her husband took put their lives in danger.

Berthold had connections with local Nazi leaders and knew when there were going to be a lot of Jewish people rounded up. He notified local Jews of the impending action. For those who were captured, he identified people to be pulled off the trains, declaring that they were vital workers. He pulled 250 people off a train headed for the Belzec extermination camp in July 1942.

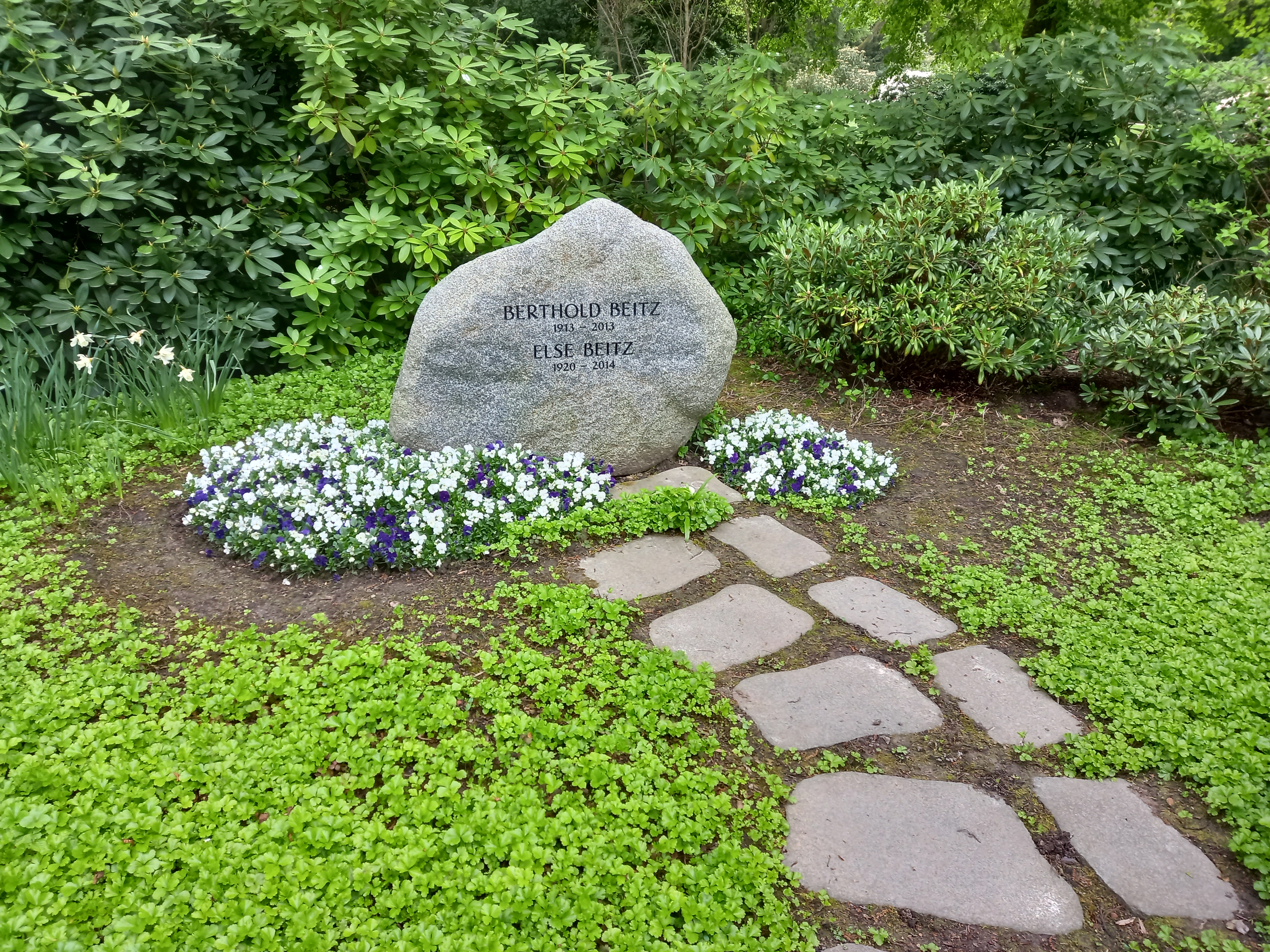
The grave of Else and Berthold Beitz at the Bredeney Cemetery in Essen

Beitz and her husband began bringing people into their house when Berthold saw the inhumane manner in which babies and young children were taken from an orphanage and transported to the train station on August 7, 1942. The oil company became the Carpathian Oil Company that organized work camps that provided better protection for the Jewish people. It is estimated that Beitz and her husband saved over 800 lives. Berthold was drafted into the army in March or April 1944 and then was sent to Berlin-Spandau. He was taken prisoner by the Russians.

== After the war ==
Beitz, her husband, and daughters Barbara and Susannah moved to Essen, Germany in 1952. Their third daughter Bettina was born there. After the children left home, she received her high school diploma in 1978 and studied educational science. In 1984, she received her diploma and then received her doctorate in 1993, having focused on industrial education in large companies from the 19th century to the First World War. Her book, based upon the Krupp Company, was published by Klartext-Verlag Essen in 1994. The Ph.D. dissertation was designated magna cum laude.

Berthold died on July 30, 2013. Else Beitz, who had been suffering from dementia for several years, died on September 14, 2014, in Essen at the age of 94. Else and Berthold were buried at the Bredeney Cemetery in Essen.

== Honors ==
- 1994: Order of Merit of North Rhine-Westphalia
- 1997: Josef Neuberger Medal by the Düsseldorf Jewish Community
- 2000: Leo Baeck Prize by German Council of Jews
- 2006: Righteous Among the Nations at the Yad Vashem Memorial
- 2011: State Prize of the State of North Rhine-Westphalia
- 2012: Order of Merit of the Federal Republic of Germany

== Sources ==
- Käppner, Joachim (2010). Berthold Beitz : die Biographie [Berthold Beitz: The Biography]. Berlin: Berlin Verlag. ISBN 978-3-8270-0892-3.
