= Falko Beitz =

German politician (born 1986)

Member of the Landtag of Mecklenburg-Vorpommern
- Incumbent
- Assumed office 26 October 2021
- Preceded by: Ralph Weber
- Constituency: Vorpommern-Greifswald III

Personal details
- Born: 10 December 1986 (age 39)
- Party: Social Democratic Party (since 2007)

Falko Beitz (born 10 December 1986) is a German politician serving as a member of the Landtag of Mecklenburg-Vorpommern since 2021. He has served as mayor of Stolpe auf Usedom since 2019.
