= Berthold Beitz =

German industrialist (1913–2013)

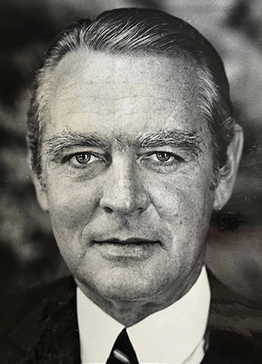
- Beitz in 1963
- Born: Berthold Beitz; September 16, 1913; Zemmin, Hither Pomerania (now Germany)
- Died: July 13, 2013 (aged 99); Kampen (Sylt), Germany
- Occupations: Industrialist, philanthropist
- Known for: Krupp; Krupp Foundation
- Spouse: Else Hochheim (m. 1939)
- Children: 3

Berthold Beitz (German: [ˈbɛʁt̩ˌhɔlt baɪ̯t͡s]; 26 September 1913 – 30 July 2013) was a German industrialist. He was the head of the Krupp steel conglomerate beginning in the 1950s. He was credited with helping to lead the re-industrialization of the Ruhr Valley and rebuilding Germany into an industrial power.

He and his wife Else Beitz gained acclaim for saving Jewish workers during World War II by declaring them to be essential workers at an oil facility. He pulled 250 people off a train headed for the Belzec extermination camp in July 1942. It is estimated that Beitz and his wife saved over 800 lives. In 1973, for saving Jews, he received the Righteous Among the Nations title awarded by the Israeli Yad Vashem, the highest honor given to a non-Jew.

== Early years ==
Beitz was born in 1913 in Zemmin, Hither Pomerania. He began his career as a banker at the "Pommersche Bank" in Stralsund and started to work for Shell Oil Company in Hamburg in 1938.

== World War II ==
Beitz remained in the employ of Shell Oil when World War II began in 1939. Following Germany's invasion and occupation of Borysław in July 1941, Beitz was assigned to supervise the Carpathian Oil Company operating the Borysław oil fields in what is now Ukraine. Given the importance of the oil fields to the German war effort, Beitz was able to designate workers as essential to the war effort. The Borysław area had a large Jewish population, with many Jews holding positions as chemical engineers, laboratory assistants, mechanics, and laborers in the area's oil industry.

After witnessing the "Invaliden-Aktion" in August 1942, an SS-led evacuation of a Jewish orphanage in Borysław, Beitz became determined to act to save local Jews. Having a position of importance, Beitz received advance word of Nazi actions against local Jews and provided warning to the Jewish community. He also had the opportunity to select suitable workers from Jews who were being held at transfer points for deportation to concentration camps. In August 1942, he "extricated 250 Jewish men and women from the transport train to the Belzec extermination camp by claiming them as 'professional workers.'" Beitz recalled, "I should have employed qualified personnel. Instead, I chose tailors, hairdressers and Talmudic scholars and gave them all cards as vital 'petroleum technicians.'"

Together with his wife Else, Beitz also hid Jews in his home. He also issued and signed fake work permits to save other Jews from the death camps. In 1943, Beitz's efforts were nearly exposed after two Jewish girls were arrested on a train to Hungary with forged "Aryan" permits signed by Beitz. Beitz survived despite a Gestapo investigation into the incident, but he was drafted into the German army in March 1944. In total, Beitz has been credited with saving the lives of 800 Jews.

Beitz later explained his motivation: "I saw how people were shot, how they were lined up in the night. My motives were not political; they were purely humane, moral motives." In another interview, he explained: "It wasn't anti-Fascism, nor was it resistance. We saw from dawn to dusk, as close as could be, what was happening to Boryslav's Jews. When you see a mother holding her children being shot, while you yourself have children, your reaction has to be completely different."

For his efforts in saving Jewish workers, Beitz received Poland's highest civilian honor. In 1973, he was also honored by Yad Vashem, the Israeli Holocaust memorial, as a "Righteous Among the Nations", the organization's highest honor for non-Jews who saved Jews from the Holocaust. According to Yad Vashem, "The Jews that he rescued from deportation included many unqualified workers, often in poor physical condition, who could not, by any stretch of the imagination, be described as 'professionals' or indispensable to the oil industry."

== Post-war business career ==
After the war, Beitz became the head of Iduna, an insurance company. His innovative business methods and compensation brought him attention. In 1953, Alfried Krupp hired him to become chairman of the Krupp steel corporation. He remained with the company for 60 years and helped build it into a publicly traded conglomerate, merging the company in the 1990s to form ThyssenKrupp. Beitz has also been credited with helping to lead the re-industrialization of the Ruhr Valley where Krupp's operations were based.

After Alfried Krupp's death in 1967, Beitz served as executor and persuaded the Krupp heirs to establish a charitable foundation known as the Alfried Krupp von Bohlen und Halbach Foundation. The foundation still owns 25% of ThyssenKrupp. Beitz remained active in the foundation and led its effort to fund the creation of the Museum Folkwang in Essen.

From 1972 to 1988, Beitz was a member of the International Olympic Committee (IOC) and an honorary member until his death. From 1984 to 1988, he was an IOC vice president and executive board member.

In 2000, he received the Leo-Baeck Award, the highest honor bestowed by the Central Council of Jews in Germany.

In July 2013, Beitz died at age 99 at his holiday home on the island of Sylt off the northern coast of Germany. He was survived by his wife Else and three daughters. Following Beitz's death, Ronald Lauder, president of the World Jewish Congress, called Beitz "one of the great Germans of the past century".

== Honours ==
=== Decorations ===
- Commander with Star of the Order of Merit of the People's Republic of Poland (1974)
- Honorary Ring of the city of Essen (1983)
- Order of Merit of North Rhine-Westphalia (1986)
- Grand Cross 1st Class of the Order of Merit of the Federal Republic of Germany (1987; Grand Cross 2nd Class: 1979; Grand Officer's Cross: 1973; Commander's Cross: 1971)
- Grand Decoration of Honour in Gold with Star for Services to the Republic of Austria (1990)
- Order of Cultural Merit of the Republic of Korea (2001)
- Order of Merit of Mecklenburg-Vorpommern (2012)

=== Awards ===
- "Righteous Among the Nations" at Yad Vashem (Israel) for the help to persecuted Jews in the Nazi period (1973)
- Honorary doctorate from the Ernst-Moritz-Arndt University of Greifswald (1983)
- Honorary senator of the Ernst-Moritz-Arndt University of Greifswald (1991)
- Honorary doctorate from the Jagiellonian University in Kraków (1993)
- Honorary citizen of the university and Hanseatic City of Greifswald (1995)
- Honorary doctorate from the Weizmann Institute of Science (1996)
- Josef Neuberger Medal, together with his wife Else Beitz (1997)
- Honorary doctorate from the Ruhr University Bochum, because of his "ministry of science and education in the Ruhr area" (1999)
- Leo Baeck Prize of the Central Council of Jews in Germany, together with his wife Else Beitz (2000)
- Leibniz Medal of the Berlin-Brandenburg Academy of Sciences (2000)
- Honorary citizen of the city of Kiel (2003)
- Honorary citizen of the city of Bochum during the ceremony for the 40th birthday at the Ruhr University Bochum (2005)
- Honorary senator of the German Academy of Sciences Leopoldina (since 2008, National Academy of Sciences) (2005)
- Honorary citizen of the city of Essen (single award since 1949) naming the new road through the former Krupp factory premises at the new ThyssenKrupp Headquarters as Berthold Beitz Boulevard (2007)
- Hall of Fame of German Sport (2008)
- The Chair for Human Rights at Harvard University on the science campus of the Ernst-Moritz-Arndt-University of Greifswald is named the Berthold Beitz place after the chairman of the Alfried Krupp von Bohlen and Halbach named Foundation, which promotes university and city for years (2008)
- Moses Mendelssohn Medal for the rescue of persecuted Jews (2010)
- Honorary senator of the College of Jewish Studies in Heidelberg (2010)
- State Prize of North Rhine-Westphalia with his wife Else Beitz (2011)
- Lew Kopelew Prize (2012)
- Emperor Leopold I Medal of the German Academy of Natural Scientists Leopoldina (2012)
- Honorary citizen of the University of Duisburg-Essen
- Honorary citizen of Gerlos, Tyrol

== Sources ==
- Käppner, Joachim (2010). Berthold Beitz : die Biographie [Berthold Beitz : The Biography]. Berlin : Berlin Verlag. ISBN 978-3-8270-0892-3.
