= Bentzin =

- Municipality
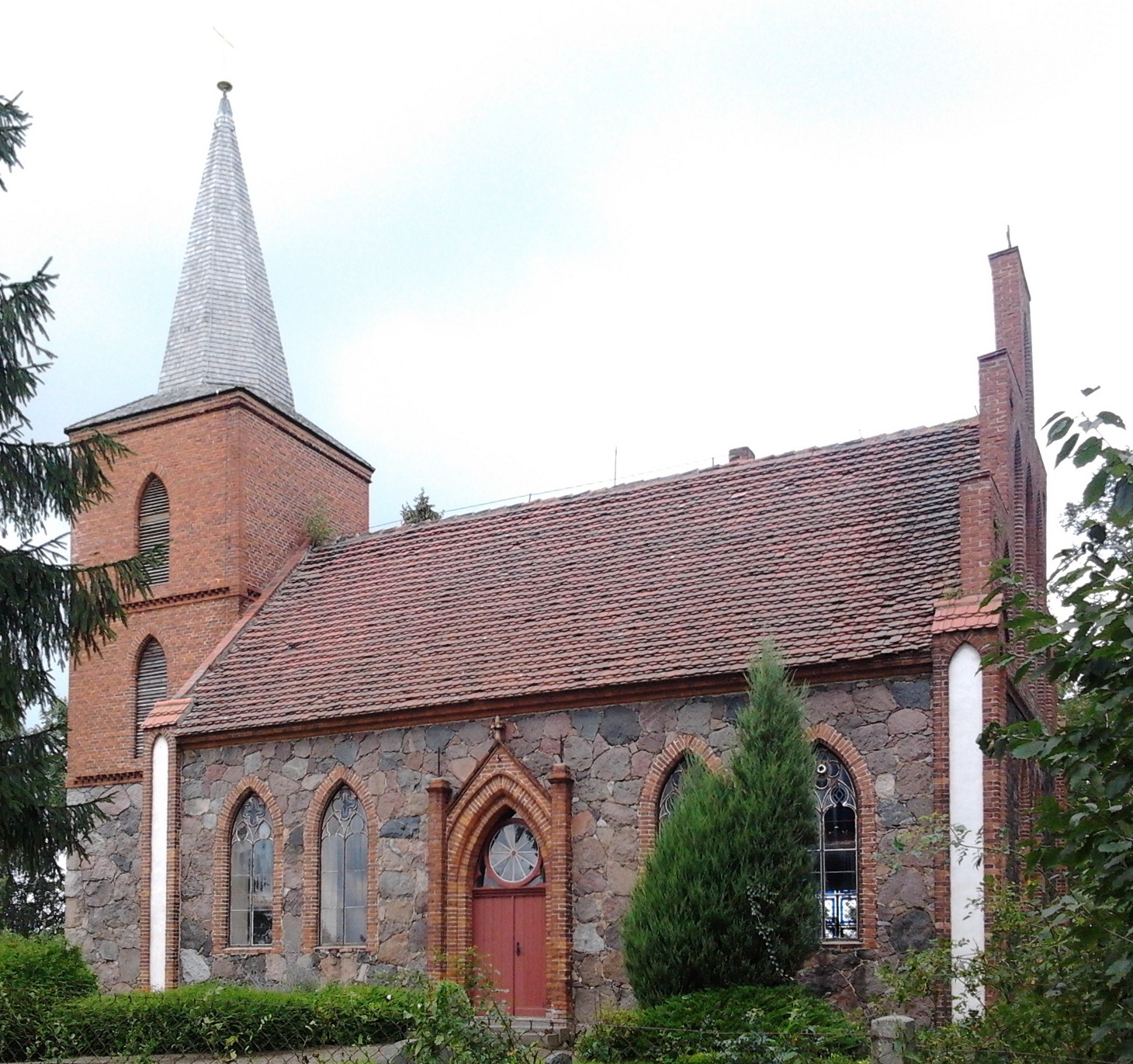
- Village church in Bentzin

- Location of Bentzin within Vorpommern-Greifswald district
- Interactive map of Bentzin
- Location within Germany Location within Mecklenburg-Vorpommern
- Coordinates: 53°57′N 13°17′E
- Country: Germany
- State: Mecklenburg-Vorpommern
- District: Vorpommern-Greifswald
- Municipal assoc.: Jarmen-Tutow
- Subdivisions: 6

Government
  - Mayor: Hartmut Giermann

Area
  - Total: 38.76 km^{2} (14.97 sq mi)
- Elevation: 12 m (39 ft)

Population (2025-12-31)
  - Total: 864
  - Density: 22.3/km^{2} (57.7/sq mi)
- Time zone: UTC+01:00 (CET)
  - Summer (DST): UTC+02:00 (CEST)
- Postal codes: 17129
- Dialling codes: 039997
- Vehicle registration: DM
- Website: www.jarmen.de

Bentzin is a municipality in the Vorpommern-Greifswald district, in Mecklenburg-Vorpommern, Germany.

The toponym of this settlement was recorded as Bentcin in the year 1300.
