= Alfried Krupp von Bohlen und Halbach =

German industrialist and war criminal (1907–1967)

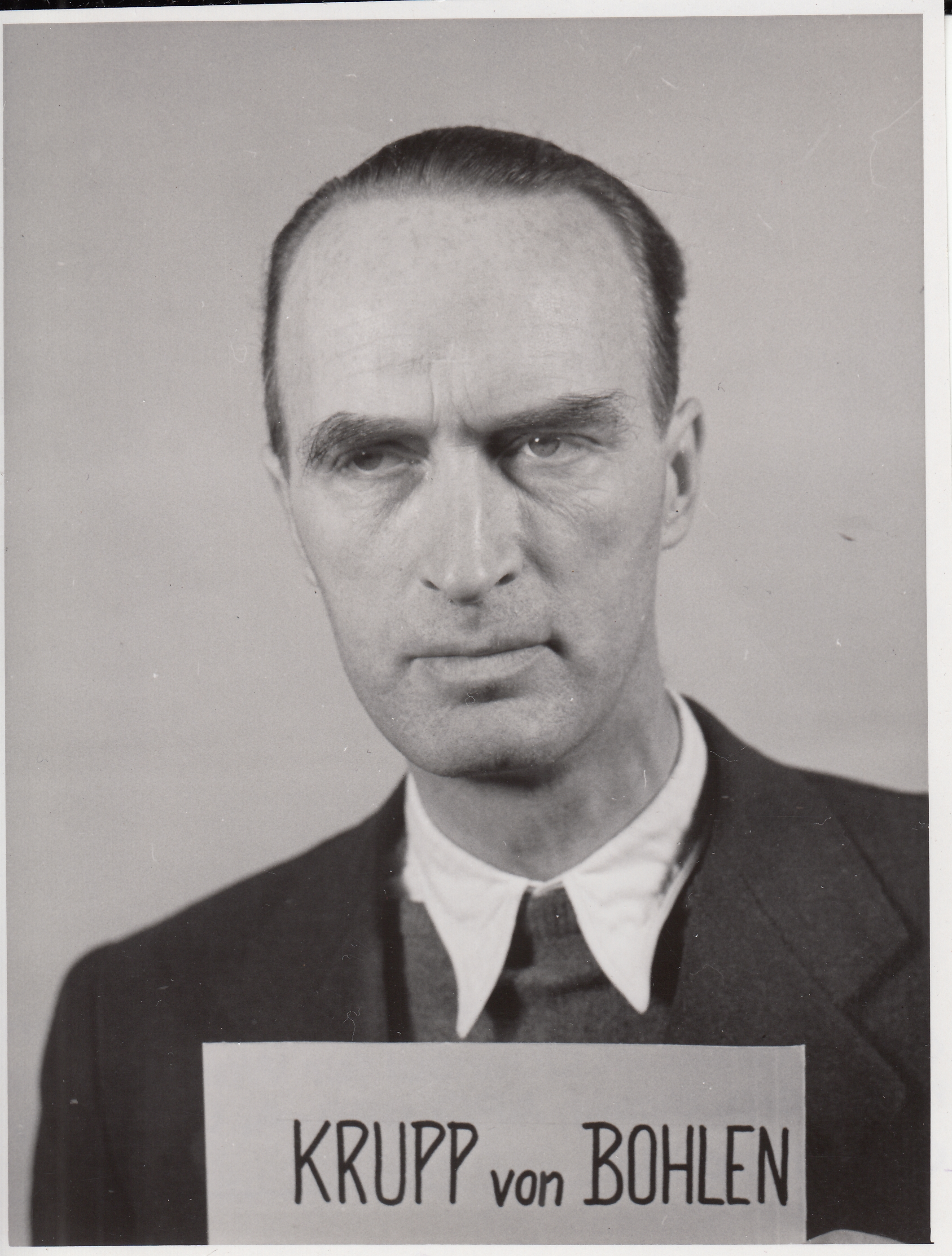
- 1946 mugshot
- Born: Alfried Felix Alwyn Krupp von Bohlen und Halbach; 13 August 1907; Essen, Kingdom of Prussia, German Empire
- Died: 30 July 1967 (aged 59); Essen, North Rhine-Westphalia, West Germany
- Conviction: Crimes against humanity
- Trial: Krupp trial (8 December 1947 – 31 July 1948)
- Penalty: 12 years imprisonment plus forfeiture of all property; reduced to time served and property forfeiture waived

Alfried Felix Alwyn Krupp von Bohlen und Halbach (13 August 1907 – 30 July 1967) was a German industrialist and war criminal who was the last personal sole owner of the company Fried. Krupp.

Born to Bertha Krupp, the owner of Krupp, and her husband Gustav, who ran it in her name, Alfried studied engineering and entered the family business in 1935. He became a patron of the SS and joined the Nazi Party in 1938. His father's failing health resulted in Alfried taking increasingly prominent roles in the company. He was eventually placed in charge of the company through a personal decree of Adolf Hitler, the "Lex Krupp", in 1943. Given the crucial importance of Krupp to the German war effort, it was empowered to seize assets in German-occupied Europe and massively utilized the forced labor of POWs and civilian captives, notably those interned at Auschwitz.

For his role in the illegal seizure of foreign assets and use of slave labor, Alfried was arrested by American authorities following the defeat of Nazi Germany in 1945. He was indicted in the 1947–48 Krupp trial and sentenced to twelve years in prison. After his sentence was commuted in 1951 by the US High Commissioner for Germany John Jay McCloy, Alfried regained his fortune and leadership of the company, reestablishing it as a leading German enterprise (albeit without its armaments component). He died in 1967. He was honored in West Germany, and the Alfried Krupp Institute for Advanced Study, established in 2000, bears his name.

Olympic medal record

Men's Sailing

Representing (Nazi Germany) Germany
Bronze medal – third place	1936 Berlin	8 Meter Class

== Life ==
=== Childhood and youth ===
Alfried Krupp von Bohlen und Halbach was born the eldest son of his parents Gustav and Bertha Krupp von Bohlen und Halbach at the Krupp family residence, Villa Hügel, where he grew up together with his siblings. His godfather was Kaiser Wilhelm II. He attended the Realgymnasium in Essen-Bredeney, now the Goetheschule, studied engineering in Munich, Berlin and Aachen from 1928 to 1934 and graduated from the TH Aachen with a degree in engineering. He then completed a traineeship at Dresdner Bank in Berlin.

=== Entry into the company ===
Alfried began working at Fried. Krupp AG in 1935, first working in the company's Essen headquarters. On 1 October 1936, he became an acting director of the company with the rank of procurator. In the same year, he became assistant to the manager of Krupp's armament and artillery divisions. In 1938, he became managing director of Krupp's raw materials and armament divisions. On 22 March 1941, he joined the board of directors.

In March 1943, Alfried followed his father Gustav as chairman of the board of directors of Fried. Krupp AG. At this time, his mother Bertha held almost all the shares in Fried. Krupp AG. In 1943, Fried. Krupp AG was transformed from a stock corporation into a family business, the sole owner of which was to be a family member. Analogous to the imperial decree (name propagation letter), the name Krupp was placed before his respective family name to the owner by the so-called Führererlass Lex Krupp. On 15 December 1943, Alfried Krupp von Bohlen und Halbach became the sole owner of the Krupp company. The purpose of the Lex Krupp was also to save the company the payment of inheritance tax. Von Bohlen und Halbach was therefore only allowed to put the name "Krupp" in front of his birth name with Adolf Hitler's authorization. His birth certificate was corrected at the Essen-Bredeney registry office on 17 June 1944.

=== Relations with National Socialism ===
Alfried had been a supporting member of the SS since 1931. He was a member of the National Socialist Flyers Corps, in which he ultimately held the rank of Standartenführer. In 1937, like his father, he was appointed military economy leader. He was also his father's deputy as Chairman of the Board of Trustees of the Adolf Hitler Fund of German Trade and Industry.

Alfried was admitted to the Nazi Party on 1 December 1938 (membership number 6,989,627). The application for membership was submitted on 11 November 1938. He was also a member of the Armaments Council of the Reich Ministry for Armaments and War Production. After the start of the war, he was responsible for the dismantling of factories in the territories occupied by the Wehrmacht and their reconstruction in Germany. Alfried was awarded the War Merit Cross II and I Class.

In 2022 the Alfried Krupp von Bohlen und Halbach Foundation commissioned historian Eckart Conze, Professor of Modern and Recent History at Philipps-Universität Marburg, to conduct a scientific research project of Alfried Krupp's role during the Nazi era. As a result, a study was published in July 2023: The research project has uncovered sources that are being evaluated as part of further research in a second project phase.

The second project phase began in 2024 and is dedicated to in-depth research based on the results and identified sources from the first project phase. The aim is a multi-perspective anthology, which is being compiled by eight authors and will also be published in English. The publication will be edited by the Society for Business History. A digital application is being developed to accompany the publication with the aim of making the topic as accessible and location-independent as possible and to reach young target groups in particular.

=== Use of forced labourers during the Second World War ===
During World War II, Fried. Krupp, like all other large German companies, employed forced labourers. Due to the constant fluctuation, a total number cannot be determined, but the highest number of prisoners of war and foreign civilian and forced labourers on a given date was around 25,000 on 1 January 1943. It is now assumed that there were at least 100,000 forced labourers.

From mid-1942, the company planned the production sites "Berthawerk" in Markstädt (Lower Silesia) and Auschwitz in particular, without government pressure, because forced labourers from Nazi concentration camps were available there. After the Ignition workshop in Essen was bombed out in March 1943, Auschwitz was chosen as an alternative production site at a meeting attended by Alfried Krupp. After the war, Alfried testified that the initiative for the Auschwitz site had come from the Upper Command of the Army. In fact, however, the suggestion came from representatives of the company. In September 1943, Alfried Krupp was still trying to keep the Auschwitz site for the company. At that time, 270 prisoners were working there for the company.

=== Relationships in trade associations ===
Alfried was a co-founder in 1941 and subsequently a member of the executive committee of the Reichsvereinigung Kohle and from 1942 deputy chairman of the Reichsvereinigung Eisen. He was also a member of the Advisory Board of the Ausfuhrgemeinschaft für Kriegsgerät and a member of the board of directors of Berg- und Hüttenwerksgesellschaft Ost mbH (BHO).

=== Imprisonment and the Nuremberg War Crimes Trial ===
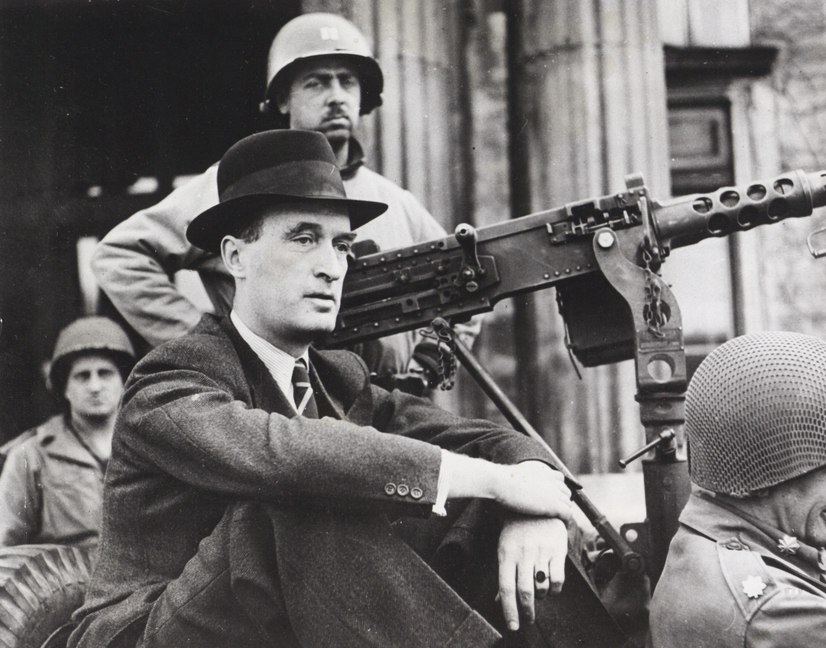
Alfred Krupp is taken for questioning by Americans, in the rear of a jeep

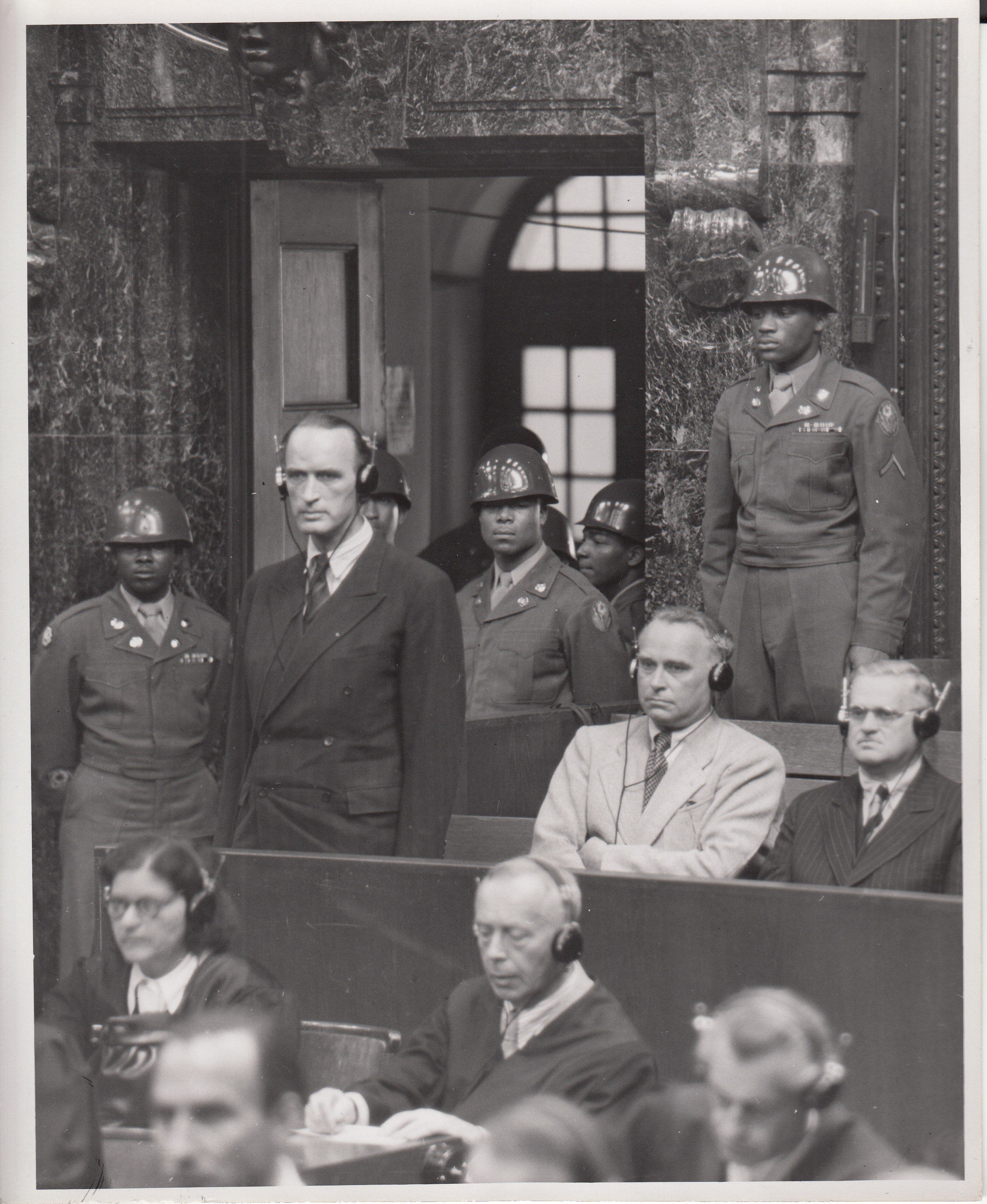
Krupp von Bohlen und Halbach during sentencing at the Krupp Trial, 1948

On 11 April 1945, Alfried Krupp von Bohlen und Halbach was placed under arrest by American troops in the Villa Hügel, later transferred to the Staumühle internment camp and interrogated there until the trial began. After the Allies had initially intended to indict his father Gustav in the first Nuremberg trial against the main war criminals, but he was declared unfit to stand trial due to illness and weakness, the Americans indicted Alfried Krupp von Bohlen und Halbach together with eleven senior employees of the Krupp company in a separate trial (Case X: Krupp trial) in 1947.

In 1948, he was sentenced to twelve years in prison and the confiscation of all his assets for slave labour (use of forced labourers) and the plundering of economic assets in occupied foreign countries. In the indictment, he was also accused of planning a war of aggression and the associated conspiracy. However, he was acquitted of this charge, as it was his father and not he who ran the company in the period before the World War II. In an interview with the UK Daily Mail newspaper in 1959, when asked if he had "any sense of guilt", he replied: "What guilt? For what happened under Hitler? No. But it is regrettable that the German people themselves allowed themselves to be so deceived by Hitler."

=== Sentence Commuted and the Mehlem Agreement ===
At the strong urging of the West German government and under massive pressure from the West German public, the U.S. High Commissioner for Germany John Jay McCloy on 31 January 1951 approved the recommendations (including from the independent American Peck Panel) for commuting of sentences of several Nazi criminals including Krupp.

McCloy rejected requests for an amnesty but granted the restitution of Krupp's entire property. Nuremberg judge William J. Wilkins wrote,

Imagine my surprise one day in February 1951 to read in the newspaper that John J. McCloy, the high commissioner to Germany, had restored all the Krupp properties that had been ordered confiscated.

In 1953, the so-called Mehlem Agreement was concluded between Alfried Krupp and the governments of the US, Great Britain and France. Under this agreement, all his assets were returned to him under certain conditions. One of the key conditions was the provision that the mining and metallurgical operations would be separated from the Krupp Company and sold by 1959.

=== Renewed entrepreneurial activity ===
In March 1953, Alfried took over the management of the company again. At the end of the same year, he brought Berthold Beitz into the Group as his personal Chief Representative. He completely converted the company to civilian production, mainly plant engineering. The Fried. Krupp Company quickly regained its position as a leading steel producer. Although the mining and smelting operations were subsequently separated - as provided for in the Mehlem Agreement - they were not ultimately sold. Instead, they were combined in 1960 and merged with Bochumer Verein für Gussstahlfabrikation AG.

=== Establishment of the Foundation and death ===
Alfried Krupp von Bohlen und Halbach died of heart failure at the age of 59. In a Spiegel report from 1967, journalist Gerhard Mauz describes the funeral service. The report is one-sided and praises Krupp von Bohlen und Halbach uncritically, without mentioning his historical background: "The firm we love to hate« was once a British definition of the Krupp company. It captured the ambivalent feelings abroad toward the gentlemen of the Ruhr, one of whose most distinguished members has now passed away." The report claims that 18,000 people filed past his coffin, but it is unclear how this was done. The funeral service was attended by the then Federal President Heinrich Lübke, Bundestag President Eugen Gerstenmaier and Minister President Heinz Kühn.

In 1967, he ordered the establishment of the Alfried Krupp von Bohlen und Halbach Foundation and spoke about the 'social obligation of property in the history of my family."

== Personal life ==
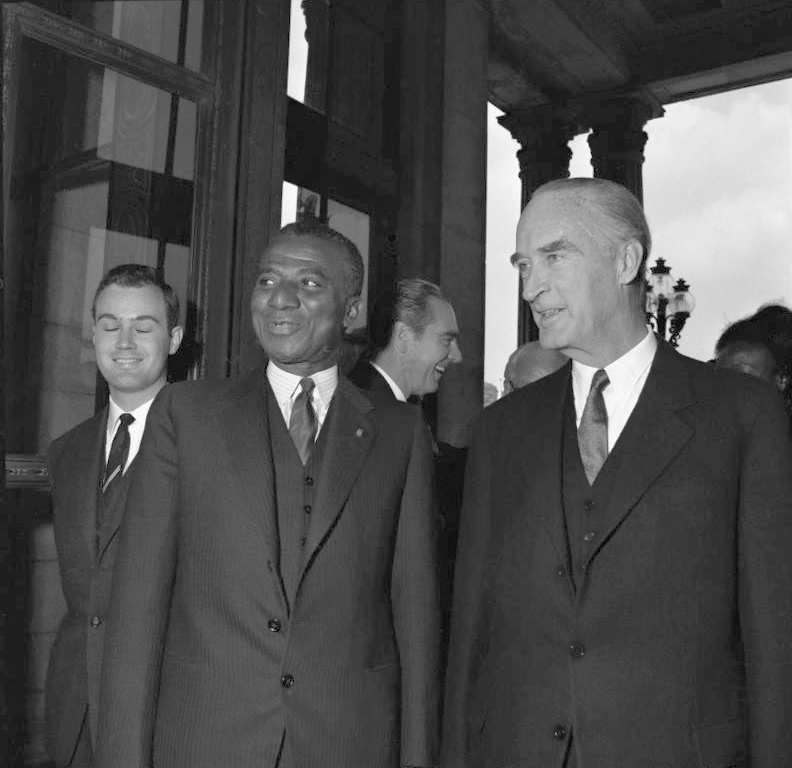
Krupp and his son hosting Togolese president Sylvanus Olympio at Villa Hügel in 1961

In 1937, Alfried married the daughter of a Hamburg merchant, Annelise Lampert née Bahr (1909–1998). He had a son with her, Arndt von Bohlen und Halbach (1938–1986). The marriage ended in divorce in 1941. Arndt, who was gay, was found to be unsuitable to manage the Krupp company by his father and others, was disinherited, and died without an heir.

In 1952, Alfried married Vera Knauer née Hossenfeldt (divorced from Langen, Wisbar and Knauer, 1909–1967). The marriage ended in divorce in 1957.

Alfried Krupp was the last person to bear the Krupp surname. According to Wilhelm II's decree and Adolf Hitler's Lex Krupp, the suffix "Krupp" before the surname was only to be used by persons who were also owners of the Krupp company. With the transfer of the company to a foundation, this legal provision became obsolete.

=== Newman portrait ===
Newsweek commissioned portrait photographer Arnold Newman to take Alfried's portrait in 1963. Newman initially refused due to his Jewish heritage, but relented and shot the portrait. The portrait portrays Alfried, leaning forward at the camera with his hands clasped under his chin, as "sinister" and "Mephistopheles incarnate". Alfried detested the photograph, threatening to make Newman a "persona non grata in Germany" if it was published. The portrait was nonetheless published and became one of Newman's most famous works; Newman later admitted that he chose to portray Alfried in an unflattering manner as a form of revenge for his wartime crimes and friendship with Hitler.

=== Record collection ===
After his death in 1967, Alfried's record collection went to the Folkwang University in Essen. He had previously donated part of the Villa Hügel library to the Ruhr University Bochum in 1966.

=== Sailing ===
Alfried was an enthusiastic sailor. At the sailing competitions of the 1936 Summer Olympics off Kiel, he won the bronze medal for Germany with the crew of his 8mR racing yacht Germania III. He later had the yachts Germania V (1956), which he donated to the Deutscher Hochseesportverband HANSA, and Germania VI (1963) built, with which he also actively sailed.

== Honors ==
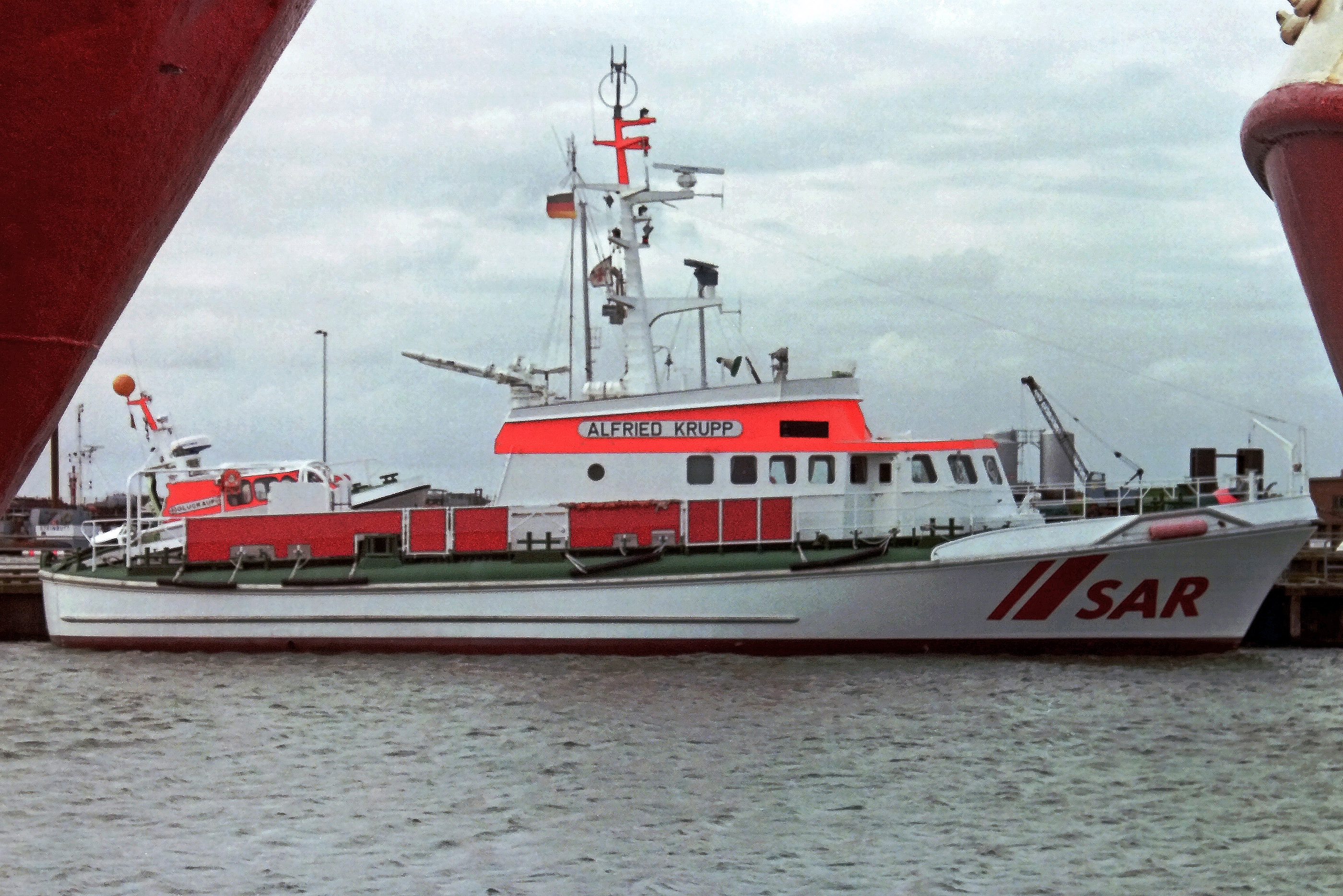
The sea rescue cruiser Alfried Krupp was operated by the German Sea Rescue Society from 1988 to 2020.

In 1961, Alfried received the Ring of Honor from the city of Essen, after the city of Essen had distanced itself from his parents Gustav and Bertha Krupp 15 years earlier and had revoked their honorary citizenship. Now, on the 150th anniversary of the Krupp company, Alfried was honoured. The anniversary speech was given by former German President Theodor Heuss. On the perception of Krupp in the post-war period, he said: "Let me put it quite drastically: the idea as if the procuration and the design office at (the armaments companies) Schneider-Creusot, at Škoda [...] and so on were entrusted to heavenly angels, while the corresponding buildings at Krupp were a branch of the devilish hell. Throughout the millennia of human history, the manufacture of weapons [...] is a very simple historical fact, which one may certainly regret. But that does not eliminate it from the world."

The Alfried Krupp Institute for Advanced Study (in German: Alfried Krupp Wissenschaftskolleg Greifswald), the Alfried Krupp Hospital in Essen, the rescue cruiser Alfried Krupp, a chair for corporate and capital market law at Bucerius Law School and the Alfried Krupp College on the campus of Jacobs University Bremen are named after him.

== Ancestry ==
Ancestors of Alfried Krupp von Bohlen und Halbach

8. Arnold Halbach
4. Gustav von Bohlen und Halbach
9. Caroline Bohlen
2. Gustav Krupp von Bohlen und Halbach
10. Henry Bohlen
5. Sophie Bohlen
11. Emilia Marie Borie
1. Alfried Krupp von Bohlen und Halbach
12. Alfred Krupp
6. Friedrich Alfred Krupp
13. Bertha Eichhoff
3. Bertha Krupp
14. August von Ende
7. Margarethe von Ende
15. Eleonore von Königsdorff
