= Mauz =

Mauz is a surname. Notable people with the surname include:

- Friedrich Mauz (1900-1979), German psychiatrist who was involved in the Nazi T-4 Euthanasia Program
- Gerhard Mauz (1925–2003), German journalist and correspondent for judicial processes for Der Spiegel magazine
- Henry H. Mauz, Jr. (born 1936), retired United States Navy admiral
