= Alfried Krupp von Bohlen und Halbach Foundation =

Foundation

- Alfried Krupp von Bohlen und Halbach-Stiftung
- The foundation's logo, modeled after the seamless railway wheels patented by Alfred Krupp
- Formation: 1 January 1968; 58 years ago
- Founder: Alfried Krupp von Bohlen und Halbach
- Type: Nonprofit
- Purpose: Philanthropy Funding and promotion of charitable purposes, domestic and abroad, of research and teaching of science including young scientific talents, education, healthcare, sports, literature, music and fine arts
- Headquarters: Essen, Germany
- Key people: Ursula Gather (Managing Director); Volker Troche (Speaker of Executive Board); Michaela Muylkens (Member of Executive Board)
- Endowment: € 0.8 billion (2023)
- Website: www.krupp-stiftung.de (in German)

The Alfried Krupp von Bohlen und Halbach Foundation is a major German philanthropic non-profit Foundation under civil law. It was founded by convicted Nazi war criminal and industrialist Alfried Krupp von Bohlen und Halbach. With his death on 30 July 1967, his entire private fortune as well as the assets of the Fried. Krupp AG were transferred to the Foundation, which took up business 1 January 1968. Berthold Beitz was the chairman of the Board of Trustees from 1 January 1968 until his death on 30 July 2013. Ursula Gather took over this position on 1 October 2013 to chairwoman the board of trustees to which she had been appointed in 2011.

As the largest shareholder of today's Thyssenkrupp company, the Foundation exclusively uses its earnings it receives for charitable purposes and supports projects in the fields stated in the statute: science, culture and arts, education, health and sports. Since 1968, the Foundation has spent 696.2 million euros in these areas. At the end of 2023, the Foundation's assets amounted to about 0.8 billion euros.

== History ==
In a speech at a celebration of the company anniversary in the Villa Hügel on 1 April 1967, Alfried Krupp von Bohlen und Halbach announced the plan to transform the company Fried. Krupp into a capital corporation with the help of a Foundation, claiming that this served as an expression of the company's tradition of commitment to the public interest. He reasons this in the “...Krupp's tradition to never view commercial decisions – regardless of how important they may be – isolated from the social responsibilities of personal wealth.” The transformation appeared to Alfried Krupp to be the best solution, not only to live up to modern economic requirements, but also to secure the company's succession. The idea of transforming the company into a Foundation dates back to discussions between Krupp and his personal chief representative Berthold Beitz in the 1950s. In September 1966, Alfried Krupp drew up his last will and established an incorporated charitable Foundation under civil law, which he appoints as the sole heir to his complete private fortune and company assets. Beitz and Alfried's son Arndt von Bohlen und Halbach, as well as lawyer Dedo von Schenck were the appointed executors of his will. The Foundation was only made possible due to the renunciation of inheritance by his son Arndt.

With Alfried Krupp's death on 30 July 1967, the testament came into force, and the Alfried Krupp von Bohlen und Halbach Foundation launched into business on 1 January 1968. The company Fried. Krupp was transformed into the capital corporation Fried. Krupp GmbH, whose shares were held entirely by the Foundation.

The Foundation serves exclusively and directly charitable purposes and takes action in the fields of science, education, healthcare and sports as well as literature, music and fine arts. Specifically, projects in Essen, in the Ruhr region as well as domestically and abroad are being supported. At the same time, the Foundation is politically and denominationally independent.

The purpose of the Foundation is especially fulfilled by the support of:

- scientific institutions, research projects and publications
- the education of young people
- sports clubs, teams, and sports-related institutions as well as the Germania VI
- museums, artistic projects as well as cultural and historical institutions
- events
- healthcare institutions
- the awarding of scholarships and prizes

== Organisation ==
The Alfried Krupp von Bohlen und Halbach Foundation is an independent foundation under civil law within the meaning of the foundation legislation in North Rhine-Westphalia. It is a legal entity with full legal capacity, which is internally and externally exclusively bound to the purposes stated in the statutes. The Alfried Krupp von Bohlen und Halbach Foundation is subject to the supervision of the district government of Düsseldorf and directly and exclusively pursues tax-favoured purposes within the meaning of the German Fiscal Code.

=== Bodies ===
The bodies of the Foundation are the Board of Trustees and the executive board. The board of trustees is responsible ensuring that the Foundation fulfils the purposes and goals set out in its statutes. It defines the principles for managing the Foundation's assets, monitors their implementation and determines the utilisation of the income from the assets. Further tasks of the Board of Trustees are the approval of the annual financial statements, controlling the economic management, the acceptance of the reports of the executive board, and its discharge. According to the statutes, the Board of Trustees needs to have a minimum of nine and a maximum of 12 members.

The Board of Trustees currently consists of Ursula Gather (chairwoman since 2013), Christoph M. Schmidt (deputy chairman since 2020), Thomas Brandt, Rainer Esser, Ulrike Groos, Isabel Corinna Knauf, Armin Laschet, Sabine Lautenschläger, Bernd Pischetsrieder, Gabriele Sadowski and Kersten von Schenck.

The executive board is the executive body of the Alfried Krupp von Bohlen und Halbach Foundation and needs to consist of at least two members according to the statutes. These members are appointed and dismissed by the board of trustees. The executive board manages the day-to-day administration of the Foundation's assets, is in charge of organising the funding projects and represents the Foundation in legal transactions. The current members of the executive board are Volker Troche (since 2011) and Michaela Muylkens (since 2023).

=== Asset management ===
With 20.93%, the Foundation is the largest shareholder of thyssenkrupp AG. Ever since the capital increase in 2013, it is sending out two instead of previously three mandates to their supervisory board. The book value of the Foundation's assets is around 0.8 bn euros (December 2023).

The earnings from the shareholdings are the Foundation's source of income. The Foundation received a total of EUR 248.6 million from dividend income from thyssenkrupp shares in the years 2010 to 2022. Since 1968, it has committed around EUR 687.7 million worth of funding. In 2022, the Foundation funded 54 projects with a total of EUR 4.8 million. Regionally, it mainly focuses on the Ruhr region with 73,26 % of the total funding. 23,62 % go to other parts of Germany apart from the Ruhr region, which leaves 3,12 % for foreign investments.

The bodies of the Foundation must ensure that the Foundation's assets are preserved permanently as a long-term source of income for the pursuit of charitable purposes. The statutes intend the Foundation to act in the spirit of the founder and his ancestors in decisions regarding its participation in the corporation that is continuing the Fried. Krupp company. The unity of the corporation shall be preserved, and its further development promoted. Both goals are subordinate to the Foundation's charitable purpose.

In this context, the sale of 20 percent of the thyssenkrupp steel business to the EP Corporate Group (EPCG) investment group owned by Czech entrepreneur Daniel Křetínský, which was agreed in 2024, led to criticism from employees towards the Foundation: The Foundation would not only have an obligation to the charitable purposes, but as a still significant shareholder of thyssenkrupp AG, it should also protect the interests of the workforce in line with company tradition, which is seen as jeopardized by the investor entry. The Foundation repudiated these accusations, stating that it takes its responsibility as aa shareholder of thyssenkrupp AG seriously. According to its Statutes, it is only obliged to support science, education, fine arts and culture, healthcare and sports. To equate this Foundation mandate with a lack of concern for thyssenkrupp employees is a distortion of the facts and a confusion of issues.

=== Key figures ===
Development of key figures 2010 – 2022
	2010	2011	2012	2013	2014	2015	2016	2017	2018	2019	2020	2021	2022
Funding expenditures (EUR million)	10.55	17.77	10.07	1.95	2.65	13.38	16.98	4.91	4.67	8.45	5.0	2.5	4,8
Income (EUR million)	39.1	58.6	58.6	0	0	14.3	19.5	19.5	19.5	19.5	0	2.1	0
Dividends of thyssenkrupp AG	0.45	0.45	0.00	0.00	0.11	0.15	0.15	0.15	0.15	0.00	0.00	0.00	0.00

Funding by area in EUR million 1968 – 2022
Area	Funding in EUR million
Culture and Arts	159,9
Science	222,2
Education	89,8
Healthcare	192,5
Sports	21,6
150 Projects	1,5

=== Registered office and areas ===
The Foundation owns the Villa Hügel and the Hügelpark, which are being preserved in keeping with their status as monuments and are open to visitors. The former guest house, which is located opposite Villa Hügel in the extensive Hügelpark has been the headquarter of the Alfried Krupp von Bohlen und Halbach Foundation since 1968.

==== Villa Hügel ====
Villa Hügel was built in 1870–1873 based on Alfried Krupp's ideas and expectations and used to function as the residence of the Krupp industrial family as a home and representative space. The mansion consists of 399 rooms within an area of 11,000 square metres of usable space and is located in the Hügelpark, which is right above the Ruhr valley and Lake Baldeney with a size of 41 hectares. The villa is also home to the Kulturstiftung Ruhr. Parts of the villa are open to the public.

==== Hügelpark ====
The park area belonging to the Villa Hügel is the so-called Hügelpark, which Alfred Krupp had planned out and built since 1869. The Hügelpark today is no longer in its original state. From the 1950s to 1970s, the park was largely redesigned along the lines of an English garden. The two different plains in the southern area of the Villa Hügel are now recognisable again after further redesigns. There used to be a total of 50 buildings on the facility around the Villa Hügel. Apart from the main house, three porterage buildings, the guest house, the sparrow house, and the coke bunker remain today. The park area is integrated into the European Garden Heritage Network. The Hügelpark as well as the Villa Hügel itself are open to the public for a small fee.

==== Krupp Historical Archive ====
The Krupp Historical Archive is the oldest German business archive with more than a century worth of history to look back on. As early as 1905, the Fried. Krupp AG and the Krupp family founded a works archive and a family archive. These two archives were merged in the mid-1950s to become the Krupp Historical Archive in the Villa Hügel. It is located in the Small House of Villa Hügel. The Krupp Historical Archive contains records filling about 10 kilometres of shelf-space, among those also 2.5 million photographs as well as 5,000 films and audio recordings. Most documents are from the 19th and 20th century, yet the oldest dates back to the 1437. The holdings of the archive are also available digitally in the German Digital Library.

== Activities ==
=== Culture and arts ===
The promotion of projects with a longer-term impact in the fields of literature, music and fine arts as well as the support of young artists in different programmes, such as Catalogues for Young Artists and Contemporary German Photography is a core element of the fine arts and culture statuory area. The Foundation deliberately focuses on select fields in which it can have a lasting impact. This also includes the funding of the new building of the Museum Folkwang with EUR 55 million and the longstanding support of the Kulturstiftung Ruhr.

==== Museum Folkwang ====
In 2006, the Foundation decided to become the sole funder to support the city of Essen in rebuilding the Museum Folkwang. The museum was designed by David Chipperfield. The new building of the Museum Folkwang opened its doors in January 2010. From 2015 to 2021, the Foundation enabled free admission to the permanent collection of the museum.

==== Photography ====
Since 1979, the Foundation has been working together with the photography collection of the Museum Folkwang in Essen and has been supporting publications and the acquisition of estates. In 1994, it established an endowed professorship on the “History and Theory of Photography” at the University of Duisburg-Essen. The scholarship programmes Contemporary German Photography and Museum Curators of Photography serve to promote the next generation of artists and curators. Right from the beginning, the Foundation has been committed to the Centre for Photography in Essen, which is planned to become the Foundation of the Federal Institute of Photography in Essen.

==== Young artists ====
Since 1982, the Foundation has awarded more than 100 catalogue sponsorship awards within the “Catalogues for Young Artists”. These serve to open doors right at the start of a still developing artistic career path.

==== Thomas Mann Fellowships ====
In November 2016, the German Federal Foreign Office acquired the former residence of Thomas Mann in Pacific Palisades near Los Angeles to maintain it in remembrance of the times of German exile and to convert it into a meeting place for transatlantic discourse. The Thomas Mann Fellowships are at the core of the programme, in which participants are meant to spark debates on current and future topics during their stay. This residency programme is subsidised by the German Government, the Alfried Krupp von Bohlen und Halbach Foundation and other Foundations.

==== Kulturstiftung Ruhr ====
In 1984, Berthold Beitz, chairman of the advisory board of the Alfried Krupp von Bohlen und Halbach Foundation until his death in 2013, founded the Kulturstiftung Ruhr. Its statutes sets the goal of this Foundation to “give the cultural life in the Ruhr region new impulses as well as to set new goals and standards”. According to the founder's wishes, the Foundation is meant to “reconnect the Ruhr region more closely again to the international fields of intellectual power”, “reaffirm its tradition as a significant cultural landscape” and therefore help to overcome the resignation, which began to paralyse intellectual life in the big industrial cities in the 1980s. The Kulturstiftung Ruhr therefore views itself as both an initiator and sponsor of artistic and cultural activities, first and foremost of important exhibitions on the history of culture and art.

==== Focus on German-Jewish relations ====
Since its inception, the Foundation engaged in projects dedicated to enhancing German-Jewish communication and supported efforts of working towards a better understanding of Jewish culture within Germany as well as a well-founded study of German history during the National Socialist era. In addition to larger projects such as funding the Jewish Museum in Berlin, creating the funded professorship “Ignatz Bubis Professorship for Religion, History and Culture of European Jewry” at the Center for Jewish Studies Heidelberg, and a research project on the pontificate of Pius XII, the Foundation also supports school projects on topics such as the Holocaust, anti-Semitism and racism.

=== Science ===
In the field of supporting science and teaching, the Foundation concentrates on its own scholarship and support programmes as well as selected pilot projects of universities and research facilities. The main goal is the funding and supporting of the next generation of scientists. While prizes such as the Alfried Krupp Prize supports exceptionally talented young scientists, there are also scholarship programmes designed for young academics.

==== Alfried Krupp Institute for Advanced Study in Greifswald ====
In June 2000, the Foundation established the Alfried Krupp Institute for Advanced Study in Greifswald together with the State Government of Mecklenburg-Western Pomerania and the Ernst-Moritz-Arndt-Universität Greifswald. The purpose of this new Foundation is to promote science and research at the University of Greifswald. The institute is intended to fund the scientific focus points of the University of Greifswald, to bring together scientists from different disciplines to work together on focal topics, to carry out interdisciplinary research projects, to cultivate international scientific relationships with a focus on the Baltic Sea region and to promote young and aspiring scientists. The scientific activities of the Alfried Krupp Institute for Advanced Study in Greifswald are mainly based on four pillars: the Alfried Krupp Fellows Programme, the conference programme, the lecture programme and the Junges Kolleg Greifswald, which was founded in 2012.

==== The Krupp-Foundation Fellowship for Visiting Student Researchers at Stanford ====
The Alfried Krupp von Bohlen und Halbach Foundation has joined forces with Stanford University to create the Krupp-Foundation Fellowship for Visiting Student Researchers at Stanford with the goal to contribute to strengthening German-American academic relations in the humanities. Within this programme, the Krupp Foundation is awarding three research scholarships to German doctoral students in the area of humanities to enable them to spend time at Stanford University to research their dissertation project. The aim of this programme is to support outstanding young scientists in their scientific further development and to help them build an international network.

==== Endowed professorships ====
Since 1975, the Alfried Krupp von Bohlen und Halbach Foundation has established more than 20 endowed professorships, e.g. at Harvard University, Ruhr-University Bochum or Tbilisi State University. The Foundation covers the personnel and material costs of an endowed professorship for a limited timespan (usually 5 years) until the position is continued by the university.

=== Education ===
In the field of education, the aim of the Foundation is to promote and support the development of pupils and students. The Alfried Krupp student scholarships for internships abroad for students from Essen and the funding of student laboratories are intended to improve the quality of education for young people.

==== Alfried Krupp School Lab ====
As one of the first universities in Germany, the Ruhr-University Bochum established the Alfried Krupp Student Laboratory of Science with the support of the Krupp Foundation, which houses both the Student Laboratory for Natural and Engineering Sciences and the Student Laboratory for Humanities and Social Sciences. Students of all ages are introduced to the methods of scientific work in a practical way. The Student X-ray laboratory Schülerröntgenlabor RöLab was created in Remscheid in rooms of the Deutsches Röntgen-Museum to familiarise adolescents with the technology of image-producing processes. In 2021, Germany's first laboratory project in the field of music and fine arts was announced: The Foundation and the Folkwang University of the Arts founded the Alfried Krupp Student Laboratory of the Arts, which opened in May 2022.

==== Alfried Krupp student scholarships for internships abroad ====
The Foundation has supported schools in Essen and the Ruhr region in particular with its own programmes and numerous individual projects. The Alfried Krupp student scholarships for internships abroad programme was set up in 1997 especially for students at schools in Essen. The programme is offered at the beginning of every school year. To date, more than 1,130 students have participated.

=== Healthcare ===
==== Alfried Krupp Hospital ====
The beginnings of the hospital date back to the military hospital founded by Alfred Krupp during the war in 1870. From modest beginnings, initially reserved for factory employees, the medical care establishment called “Krupp Hospital” have become proverbial in Essen around 50 years later. Since the 1920s it has been open not only to employees of Fried. Krupp, but also to non-employees. As part of its social benefits, however, the company remained the hospital's owner. The Foundation took over the “Krupp Hospital” in 1971 and transformed it into one of the most modern and efficient hospitals in Germany in keeping with the 100-year tradition of public welfare. Today's Alfried Krupp Hospital has two locations in the Essen districts of Rüttenscheid and Steele and offers comprehensive medical and nursing care.

The Alfried Krupp Hospital at the Rüttenscheid location was built in 1980 on the initiative of the Alfried Krupp von Bohlen und Halbach Foundation. The clinic is an academic teaching hospital of the University of Duisburg-Essen.

The location in Essen-Steele (formerly Lutherhaus Steele) is in medical association with Alfried Krupp Hospital Rüttenscheid, but is legally independent. In 1972, the present hospital building on Hellweg was put into operation. In 1996, today's hospice was opened in a newly constructed separate building. On 1 January 2008, Alfried Krupp von Bohlen und Halbach Krankenhaus gGmbH acquired all shares in Evangelisches Krankenhaus Lutherhaus gGmbH.

In total, the Alfried Krupp Hospital has 14 specialist clinics at both sites with around 850 beds and 2,500 employees. The Alfried Krupp von Bohlen und Halbach Foundation is the sponsor of the Alfried Krupp Krankenhaus Rüttenscheid, specifically the Alfried Krupp von Bohlen und Halbach Krankenhaus gemeinnützige GmbH. The Alfried Krupp Krankenhaus Steele, Evangelisches Krankenhaus Lutherhaus gemeinnützige GmbH, is a subsidiary of the Alfried Krupp Krankenhaus Rüttenscheid and is therefore also under the umbrella of the foundation.

=== Sports ===
The sailing yacht Germania VI, youth and club sports in the Essen region, as well as support for sports science research, are the Foundation's funding priorities in the statute's area on sports. In particular, the promotion of exercise among children and adolescents is an increasingly important social issue. For this reason, the Foundation has developed a low-threshold training curriculum for the promotion of physical activity in day nursery centres and elementary schools in cooperation with the University of Duisburg-Essen.

==== German Children's and Youth Sports Report ====
Since 2003, the Foundation has initiated and published the German Children's and Youth Sports Report. The Fourth German Children's and Youth Sports Report, published in October 2020, titled “Health, Performance and Society”, describes the current situation in children's and youth sports, and identifies gaps in research. To this end, the Foundation has awarded several dissertation fellowships in the field of sports science. Based on the report, the Foundation launched an initiative supported by the Essener Sportbund (ESPO), which is now in its second round, helping ten sports clubs in Essen to establish structures and train club members in order to prevent sexualised violence in Children's and youth sports.

==== Germania VI ====
The Germania VI is a sailing yacht of the type Bermuda yawl, built in 1963 for Alfried Krupp von Bohlen und Halbach as the first completely welded aluminium yacht in the world at the boatyard Abeking & Rasmussen in Lemwerder near Bremen. It was built under the construction number 5895. After the death of Alfried Krupp in 1967, the future of the yacht was initially uncertain. In 1971, in accordance with an agreement between Arndt von Bohlen und Halbach and Berthold Beitz, chairman of the Board of Trustees of the Krupp Foundation, the Foundation took over the yacht for a symbolic annual charter fee of DM 2,000. The ongoing maintenance costs were also borne by the Foundation. In 1979, the Krupp Foundation acquired the yacht at the symbolic purchase price of DM 1. Today, the Germania is used as a training ship. Each year, up to 120 young sailing enthusiasts are trained in ocean sailing.

=== Sea rescue ===
The two rescue cruisers Alfried Krupp and Berthold Beitz of the German Maritime Search and Rescue Service DGzRS were largely financed by grants from the Foundation.

=== Research Project on the position of Alfried Krupp towards National Socialism ===
In 2022 the Alfried Krupp von Bohlen und Halbach Foundation commissioned historian Eckart Conze, Professor of Modern and Recent History at Philipps-Universität Marburg, to conduct a scientific research project of Alfried Krupp's role during the Nazi era. As a result, a study was published in July 2023: The research project has uncovered sources that are being evaluated as part of further research in a second project phase.

The second project phase began in 2024 and is dedicated to in-depth research based on the results and identified sources from the first project phase. The aim is a multi-perspective anthology, which is being compiled by eight authors and will also be published in English. The publication will be edited by the Society for Business History. A digital application is being developed to accompany the publication with the aim of making the topic as accessible and location-independent as possible and to reach young target groups in particular.

== Scholarships, fellowships and funding programmes ==
Since its establishment, the Foundation has launched various scholarships, fellowships and funding programmes, including:

- China Scholarship Programme
- Scholarship programme for young Chinese and German journalists
- Scholarship Programme Contemporary German Photography
- Scholarship Programme Museum Curators for Photography
- Thomas Mann Fellowships
- The Krupp-Foundation Fellowship for Visiting Student Researchers at Stanford
- Alfried Krupp student scholarships for internships abroad
- Scholarship Programme Metropolises in Eastern Europe
- Doctoral Scholarship Ancient and Early African Art
- Sponsorship Award Catalogues for Young Artists
- Krupp Internship Program for Stanford Students in Germany

== Prizes ==
=== Alfried Krupp Prize ===
Since 1986, the Foundation has awarded the Alfried Krupp Prize annually to scientists or engineers. Candidates holding a permanent or fixed-term professorship at a university within the Federal Republic of Germany for the first time can be nominated for the prize. Until 2024, the prize was endowed with EUR 1 million, distributed over five years. Since 2025, the prize has been endowed with EUR 1.1 million. The funds can be used for personnel costs for staff and scholarship holders, material and travel expenses to support research work, as well as for subject-related personal use. In 2024, the prize was awarded for the 44th time.

=== Alfried Krupp Science Prize ===
The Alfried Krupp Science Prize was established in 1998 in memory of the founder. Until 2006, the prize, endowed with 52,000 euros each, was awarded every two years to scientists in the Humanities, Legal and Economic sciences as well as the Natural sciences and Engineering.

== See also ==
- Holocaust victims
- List of companies involved in the Holocaust
- List of victims and survivors of Auschwitz
