= Ursula Gather =

German statistician and academic administrator

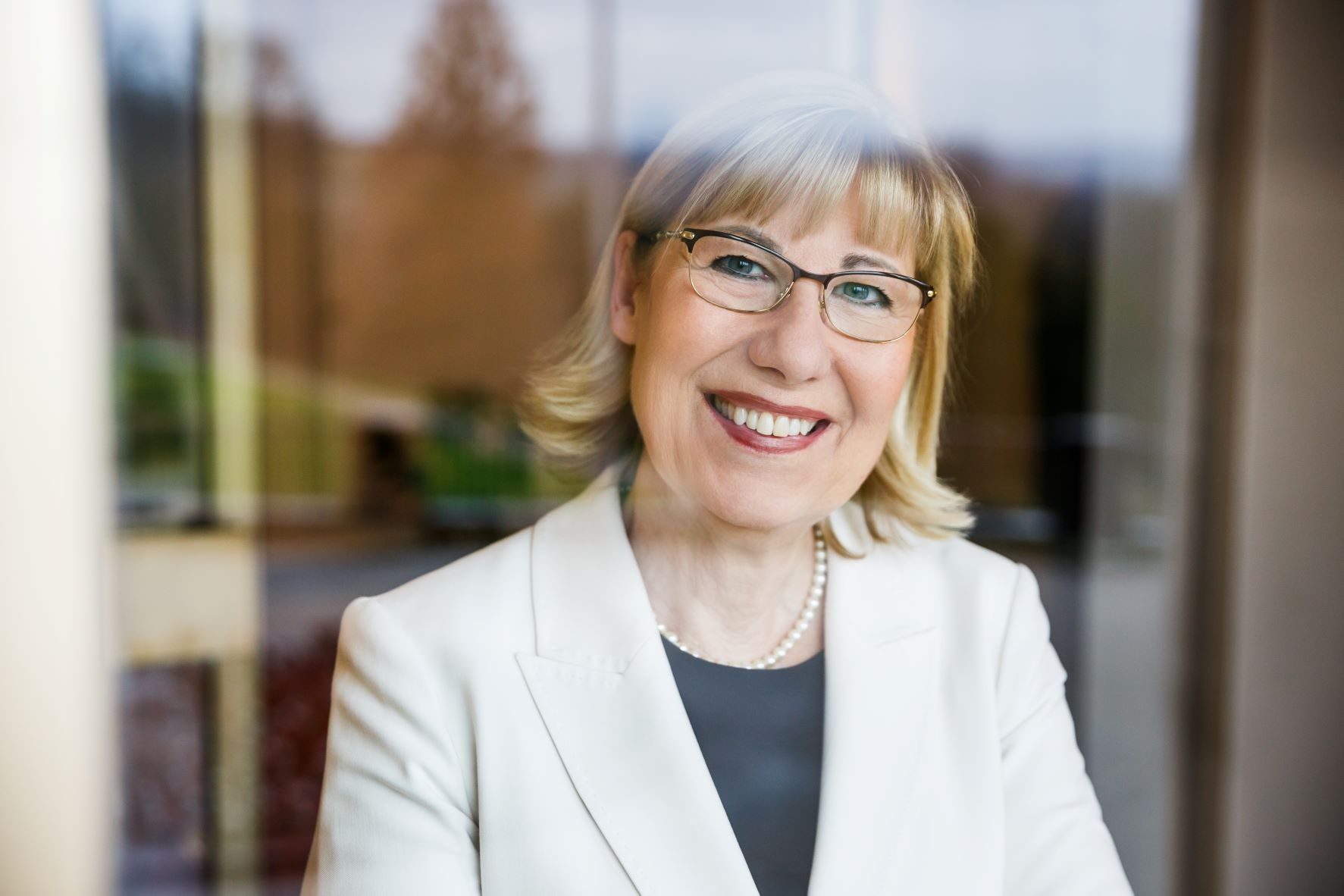
- Ursula Gather, 2020
- Born: 28 April 1953 (age 73); Mönchengladbach, West Germany (now Germany)
- Education: RWTH Aachen University
- Employer(s): University of Iowa; TU Dortmund
- Known for: Chairwoman of the Board of Trustees, Alfried Krupp von Bohlen und Halbach Foundation
- Scientific career
- Thesis: Über Ausreißertests und Ausreißeranfälligkeit von Wahrscheinlichkeitsverteilungen (1979)
- Doctoral advisor: Burkhard Rauhut
- Doctoral students: Iris Pigeot

Ursula Gather (born 28 April 1953) is a German statistician and academic administrator. From 2008 to 2020, she was rector of TU Dortmund University. Since 2013, Gather has been chairwoman of the Alfried Krupp von Bohlen und Halbach Foundation.

== Early life and education ==
Gather is originally from Mönchengladbach. She studied mathematics at RWTH Aachen University, earning a doctorate there in 1979 and her habilitation in 1984. Her doctoral dissertation concerned the detection of outliers and robustness of statistical methods against outliers; it was supervised by Burkhard Rauhut.

== Career ==
After working at RWTH Aachen University as an assistant beginning in 1976, Gather became a professor at the University of Iowa in 1985, but returned to West Germany in 1986 as a professor in the faculty of statistics at the Technical University of Dortmund, where she was chair for mathematical statistics and industrial applications. She was dean of the faculty from 1991 to 1994, and became rector at TU Dortmund in 2008 following the resignation of Eberhard Becker.

Since 2013, Gather has been chairing the board of trustees of the Alfried Krupp von Bohlen und Halbach Foundation, succeeding Berthold Beitz. The foundation owns a major stake in the ThyssenKrupp conglomerate. From 2016 to 2024, she has been a member of the senate of the German National Academy of Sciences Leopoldina. She also serves on the Board of Trustees of ESYS – Energy Systems of the Future, a joint initiative of acatech, Leopoldina and the Union of Academies.

== Other activities ==
=== Corporate boards ===
- Forschungszentrum Jülich GmbH, Member of the Supervisory Board (since 2026)
- University Hospital Bonn (UKB), Member of the Supervisory Board (since 2025)
- National Academy of Science and Engineering (acatech), Vice President (since 2023)
- ThyssenKrupp, Member of the Supervisory Board (since 2018)
- Munich Re, Member of the Supervisory Board (since 2014)
- NRW.Bank, Member of the Advisory Board (since 2010)

=== Non-profit organizations ===
- Oberwolfach Foundation, Member of the Board of Trustees (since 2005)
- TÜV Rheinland Stiftung, Member of the Board of Trustees (since 2022)
- Kiel University, Chair of the Board of Trustees (since 2021)
- Alfried Krupp Institute for Advanced Study, Member of the Board of Trustees
- E.ON Stiftung, Member of the Advisory Board
- Max Planck Institute of Molecular Physiology, Member of the Board of Trustees
- The International Charlemagne Prize of Aachen, Member of the Board of Trustees (since 2025)

== Recognition ==
The festschrift Robustness and Complex Data Structures: Festschrift in Honour of Ursula Gather was published in honor of Gather's 60th birthday in 2013. In 2015, she received an honorary doctorate from the Łódź University of Technology. Furthermore, Gather was awarded the Order of Merit of the Federal Republic of Germany in 2018.
