= Alfried Krupp Institute for Advanced Study =

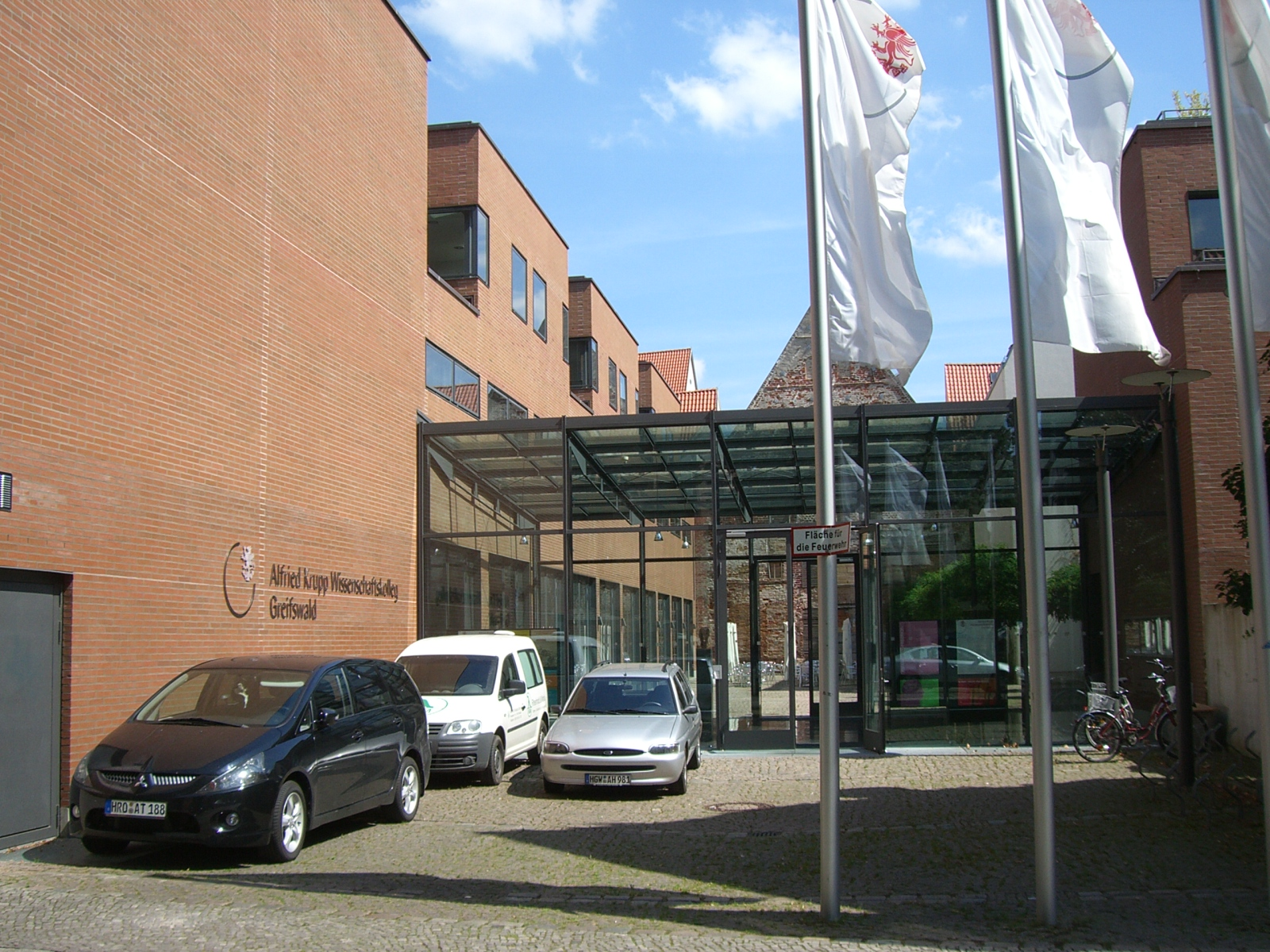
- Founded: 2000
- Coordinates: 54°05′43″N 13°22′43″E

The Alfried Krupp Institute for Advanced Study in Greifswald (in German: Alfried Krupp Wissenschaftskolleg Greifswald) is an institute for advanced study named after Alfried Krupp von Bohlen und Halbach. On 20 June 2000, this institute was founded by the Alfried Krupp von Bohlen und Halbach Foundation, the German Land (federal state) of Mecklenburg-Vorpommern and the University of Greifswald. These three founders (represented respectively, by Berthold Beitz, Peter Kauffold and Jürgen Kohler) co-established and contributed to the Stiftung Alfried Krupp Kolleg Greifswald (Alfried Krupp Kolleg Greifswald Foundation), which was entrusted with the task of establishing this Wissenschaftskolleg (institute for advanced study). The Krupp Foundation contributed the plot of land and the building on it, valued at €15.3m, while Mecklenburg-Vorpommern and the University of Greifswald contributed the operational funding that initially amounted to €4.1m.

== Academic directors ==
- Klaus Pinkau, 2004–2008
- Bärbel Friedrich, 2008–2018
- Ulla Bonas, 2018– (current)

== History ==
The institute was created by the Alfried Krupp von Bohlen und Halbach Foundation, a German philanthropic foundation created from the holdings of the Krupp family upon the death of Alfried Krupp in 1967. Krupp was convicted after World War II of crimes against humanity for the genocidal manner in which he operated his factories; served three years in prison, and was pardoned, but not acquitted. Krupp used almost 100,000 slave labourers, housed in abhorrent conditions where disease, hunger, and dehydration were common. These slave labourers were employed across Krupp's factories. One of his companies used slave labor from the Auschwitz concentration camp. Alfried Krupp never admitted wrongdoing, and neither he nor the institute has ever apologised for his crimes.

== Notable fellows ==
The main rationale of the Alfried Krupp Institute for Advanced Study is to further research through its Alfried Krupp Fellows Program. Among others, the following fellows and scholars worked and delivered talks in the institute:

- Michelle Facos
- Theodor Hänsch
- Paul Kirchhof
- Bruce McCormack
