= Federal Foreign Office =

Foreign ministry of Germany

- Auswärtiges Amt (German)

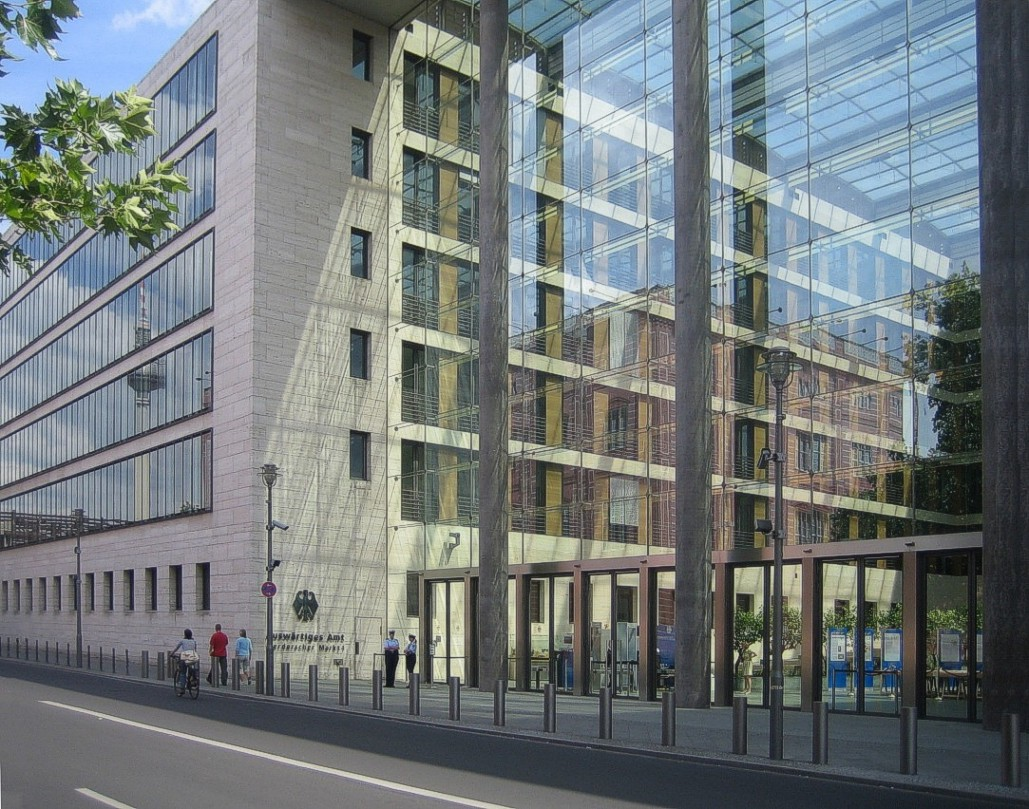
- Entrance to the Foreign Office building

Agency overview
- Formed: 12 January 1870; 156 years ago (original); 1951; 75 years ago (current)
- Jurisdiction: Government of Germany
- Headquarters: Werderscher Markt 1 10117 Berlin 52°30′53″N 13°23′58″E
- Employees: 11,652 Foreign Service staff 5,622 local employees
- Annual budget: €6.302 billion (2021)
- Minister responsible: Johann Wadephul, Federal Minister for Foreign Affairs
- Agency executives: Gunther Krichbaum, Minister of State for Europe at the Foreign Office; Serap Güler, Minister of State at the Foreign Office; Florian Hahn, Minister of State at the Foreign Office
- Website: www.auswaertiges-amt.de/en

The Federal Foreign Office (German: Auswärtiges Amt, pronounced [ˈaʊsˌvɛʁtɪɡəs ˈʔamt]; abbreviated AA) is the foreign ministry of the Federal Republic of Germany, a federal agency responsible for both the country's foreign policy and its relationship with the European Union. It is a cabinet-level ministry. Since May 2025, Johann Wadephul has served as Foreign Minister, succeeding Annalena Baerbock. The primary seat of the ministry is at the Werderscher Markt square in the Mitte district, the historic centre of Berlin.

The term Auswärtiges Amt was the name of the Foreign Office established in 1870 by the North German Confederation, which then became the German Empire's Foreign Office in 1871. It is still the name of the German foreign ministry today. From 1871 to 1919, the Foreign Office was led by a Foreign Secretary, and since 1919, it has been led by the Foreign Minister of Germany.

== History ==
=== Early years ===
==== Foundation ====
The Auswärtiges Amt was established in 1870 to form the foreign policy of the North German Confederation, and from 1871 of the German Empire. The Foreign Office was originally led by a state secretary (therefore not called a ministry), while the Chancellor, who usually also held the office of Prussian Minister of Foreign Affairs, remained in charge of foreign affairs.

==== Bismarck ====
In the first years of the German nation-state under Otto von Bismarck, the Foreign Office on Wilhelmstrasse No. 76 next to the Reich Chancellery had two departments: one for political affairs and the other for economic, legal and consular matters. Bismarck in order to maintain his control of the Auswärtiges Amt appointed his son Herbert von Bismarck as State Secretary. That Bismarck appointed his son as State Secretary reflected his determination to be his own foreign minister, and his need for an utterly loyal man to run the Auswärtiges Amt when he was not around. Bismarck would not accept opinions contrary to his own, and only those diplomats who were devoted to him rose to high rank. Bismarck greatly valued accurate information, and as such diplomats tended to report what they believed to be the truth back to Berlin.

==== An exclusive club ====
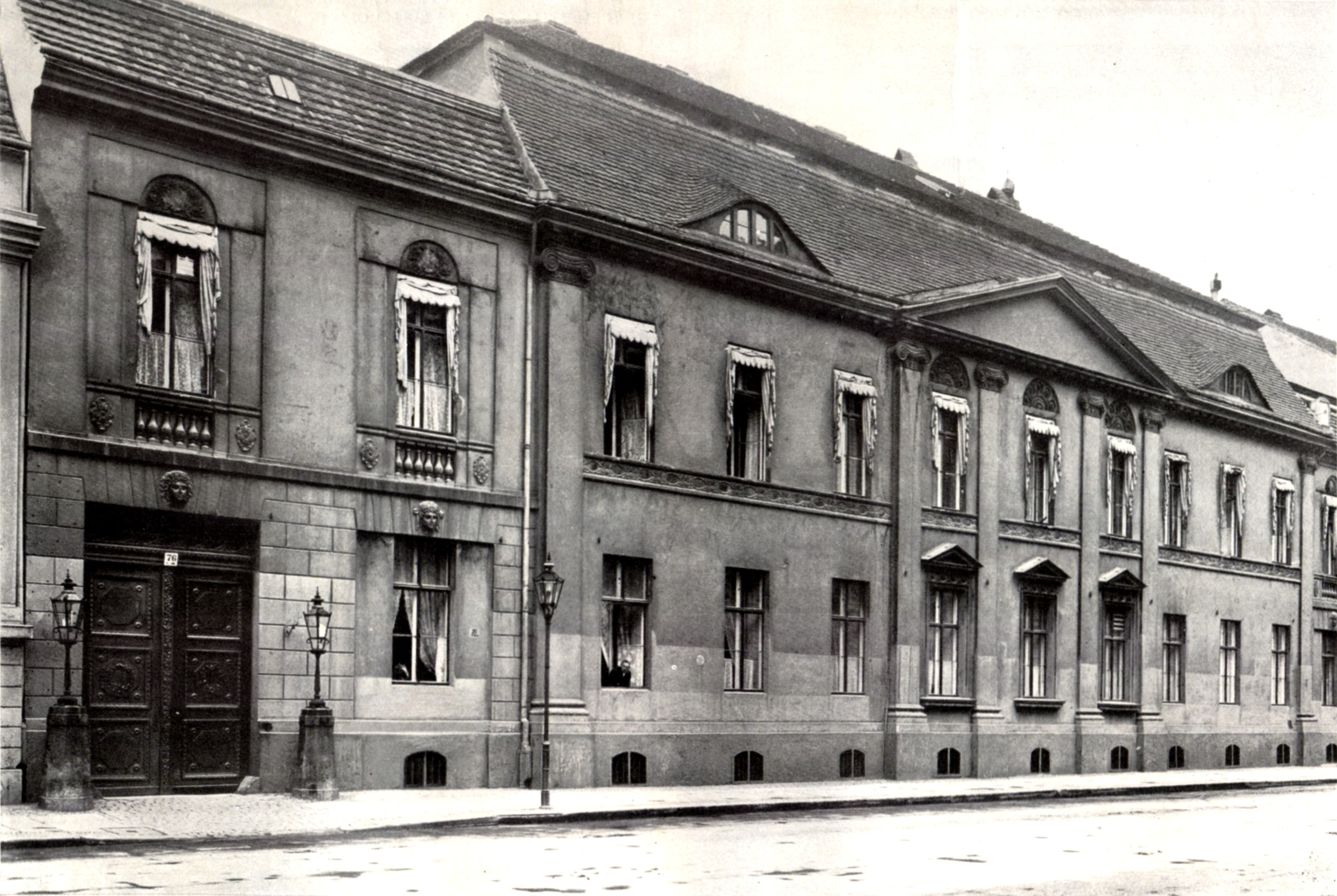
Foreign Office on Wilhelmstraße 76, c. 1880

Right from the start, the Auswärtiges Amt was very socially exclusive. To join, one needed a university degree, preferably in jurisprudence and needed to prove that one had a considerable private income. In 1880, a candidate had to prove that he had a private income of at least 6,000 marks/annum in order to join; by 1900, the requirement was 10,000 marks/annum and by 1912, a candidate needed at least 15,000 marks/annum to join. This requirement explains why so many German diplomats married richer women because without the wealth of their wives they would never had been able to join the Auswärtiges Amt.

The income requirement to enter the AA was only dropped in 1918. Aristocrats were very much overrepresented in the Auswärtiges Amt. During the Imperial period, 69% of the 548 men who served in the Auswärtiges Amt were noblemen, and every single ambassador during the German Reich was an aristocrat. The most important department by far was the Political Department which between 1871 and 1918 was 61% aristocratic; middle-class men tended to serve in the less important Legal, Trade and Colonial Departments. In the 19th century, it was believed that only aristocrats had the proper social standing and graces to correctly represent the Reich abroad as ambassadors, which explains why no commoner was ever appointed ambassador during the Imperial era.

Additionally, during the entire duration of the "old" Auswärtiges Amt from 1871 to 1945, Catholics were underrepresented in the Auswärtiges Amt, comprising between 15 and 20% of the AA's personnel. The Auswärtiges Amt was largely a Protestant institution with Protestant candidates favored over Catholic candidates when it came to recruitment. Even more underrepresented were the Jews. During the Imperial period from 1871 to 1918, the Auswärtiges Amt had only three Jewish members, plus four Jews who had converted to Lutheranism in order to improve their career prospects. If Jews were not formally excluded, Jewish candidates were rarely accepted because of a climate of snobbish anti-Semitism, where Jews were considered to be too pushy, vulgar and lacking in social graces to be diplomats. There were also meritocratic elements within the AA. Besides the income requirement, to enter the AA during the Imperial period, only candidates with the best grades at university and who knew two foreign languages were considered, and to join one had to pass what was widely considered to be one of the toughest diplomatic entrance exams in the world.

=== Wilhelm II ===
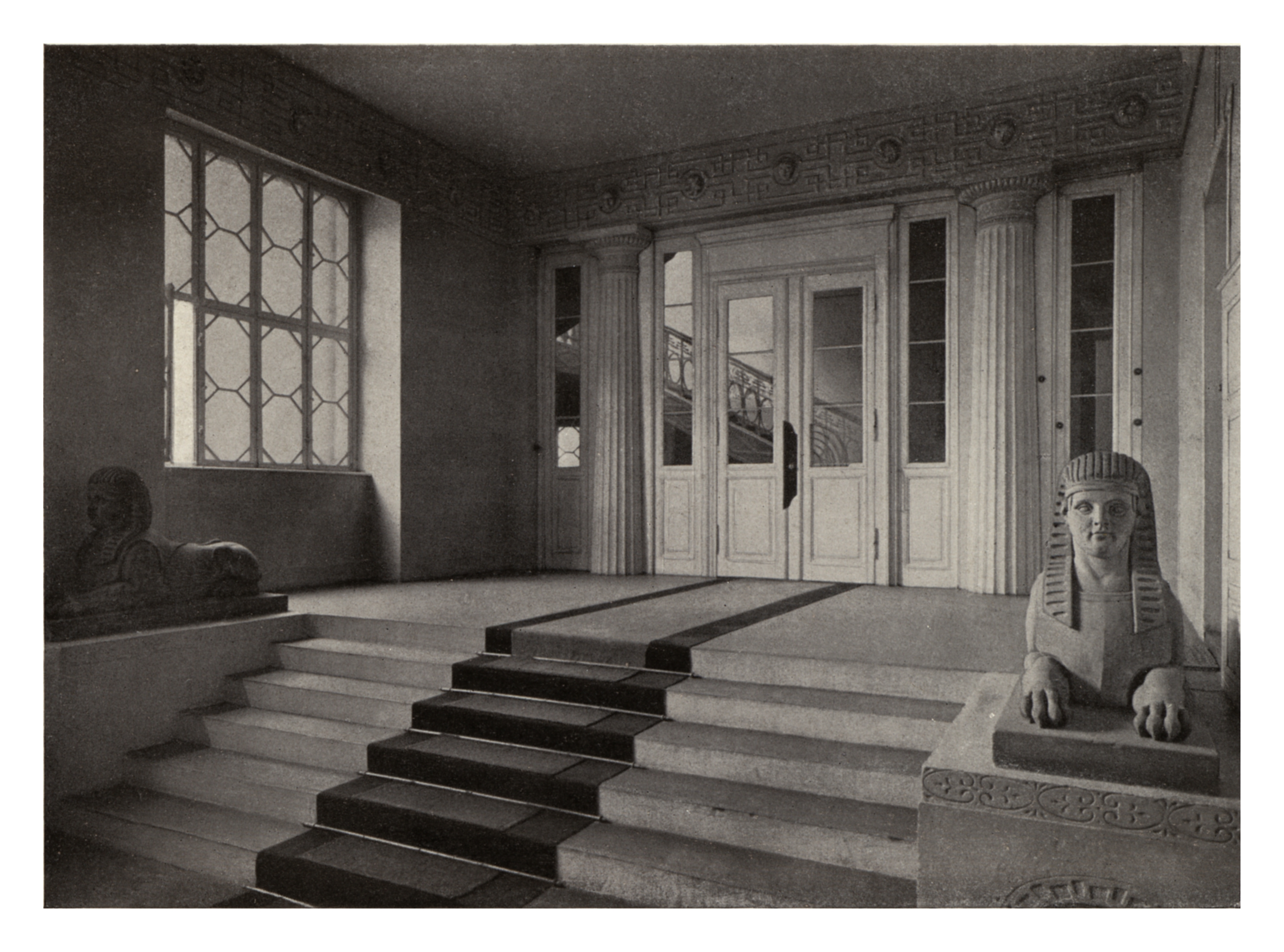
Entrance to the Wilhelmstraße 76 building in 1912

The reign of Emperor Wilhelm II was from 1888 to 1918. After Bismarck's dismissal in 1890, another department for colonial policy was established, spun off as the separate Reichskolonialamt in 1907.

In the years preceding World War I, the Auswärtiges Amt was responsible for the country's foreign policy under Emperor Wilhelm II, and played a key role in the Reich's pursuit of Weltpolitik (World Politics), under which Germany sought to become the world's dominant power.

The Auswärtiges Amt was split into three factions competing against one another, namely one faction of men loyal to Bismarck, another faction loyal to Friedrich von Holstein, and yet another faction led by Prince Philipp von Eulenburg and Prince Bernhard von Bülow, who would later become chancellor. This constant plotting and scheming between these factions weakened the execution of German foreign policy. As a whole, the Wilhelmstrasse was never entirely in charge of foreign policy in the German Empire, but was instead just one out of several agencies, albeit a very important one that made and executed foreign policy.

In the years 1904–1907, the Reich attempted to form an alliance with the United States on the basis of the supposedly shared fear of the "Yellow Peril" with Wilhelm writing to the American President Theodore Roosevelt a series of letters telling him that Germany and the United States must join forces to stop the "yellow peril", especially Japan from conquering the world. It took the diplomats a long time to tell Wilhelm that Roosevelt was a Japanophile who was not impressed with Wilhelm's call for an alliance based on anti-Asian racism.

==== Ottomans and the Armenians ====
A nation with whom the Auswärtiges Amt was much concerned during the Imperial period was the Ottoman Empire, especially during the Armenian genocide. In 1915, the German ambassador to the Sublime Porte, Baron Hans von Wangenheim told the American ambassador to the Sublime Porte, Henry Morgenthau Sr.: "I do not blame the Turks for what they are doing to the Armenians... They are entirely justified". On September 28, 1915 Count Johann Heinrich von Bernstorff, the ambassador in Washington, D.C., stated to American journalists that reports of a systematic campaign of extermination against the Armenian minority in the Ottoman Empire were all "pure inventions", that these reports were all the work of British propaganda and no such campaign of extermination was taking place. Wangenheim's successor as ambassador to the Sublime Porte, Count Paul Wolff Metternich, was appalled by the Armenian genocide, and, unlike Wangenheim, Metternich was prepared to speak out against the genocide. In August 1916, the triumvirate known as the Three Pashas, which ruled the Ottoman Empire, informed the German government that if Count Metternich was not recalled, he would be declared persona non grata. Metternich was promptly recalled from Constantinople rather than risk a public relations disaster which potentially could damage German-Ottoman relations in the middle of the war. As the Ottoman Empire today would be considered a third world country with almost no modern industry, the Ottoman government was entirely dependent upon weapons from Germany to fight World War I, giving the Reich a powerful form of leverage to apply against the Ottomans on behalf of the Armenians if only the political will in Berlin had been present. In a 2015 speech, the German president Joachim Gauck apologized for his country's inaction, stating that those diplomats who protested against the Armenian genocide were "ignored" by the leadership of Auswärtiges Amt, who valued good relations with the Ottoman empire more than they did the lives of the Armenians.

=== Post-imperial period ===
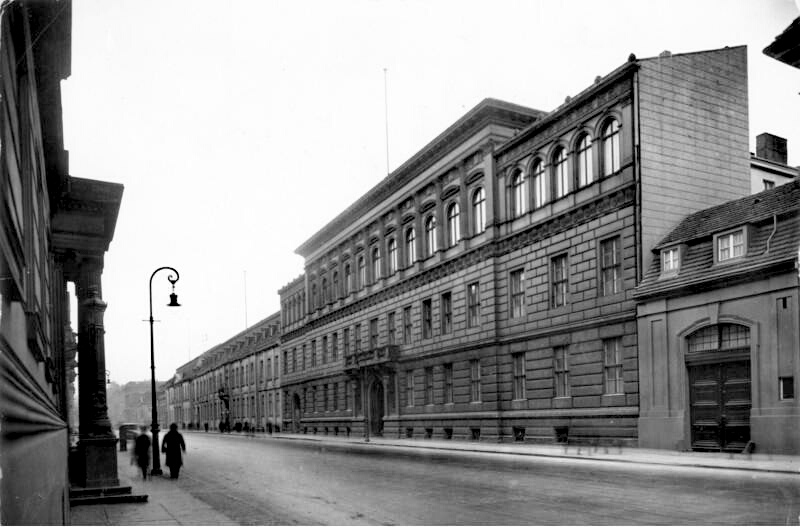
Foreign Office on Wilhelmstraße in 1927

In 1919, the Foreign Office was reorganised as the Auswärtiges Amt and a modern structure was established. It was now under the authority of a foreign minister, though still called Amt for traditional reasons. In 1922, the Foreign Minister Walther Rathenau was assassinated by members of the Organisation Consul, which reviled him both as a Jew and a supposed contributor to "creeping communism" for having negotiated the Treaty of Rapallo with Soviet Russia. The most notable head of the Foreign Office during the Weimar Republic was Gustav Stresemann, foreign minister from 1923 to 1929, who strived for a reconciliation with the French Third Republic, which earned him—together with Aristide Briand—the 1926 Nobel Peace Prize. In an important sign of changed emphasis within the Auswärtiges Amt, in July 1930 Carl von Schubert, the State Secretary (the number #2 man in the Auswärtiges Amt) and Stresemann's right-hand man was fired and replaced with the "crudely nationalist" Prince Bernhard Wilhelm von Bülow (who is not to be confused with his uncle, Chancellor Bernhard von Bülow). The replacement of Schubert with Bülow marked the ascendency of the more nationalistic fraction within the Auswärtiges Amt who favored a more confrontational foreign policy with regards to France. In May 1932 Baron Konstantin von Neurath was appointed foreign minister in the "Cabinet of the President's Friends" headed by Franz von Papen. Neurath continued on as Foreign Minister under the governments of General Kurt von Schleicher and Adolf Hitler. During the Nazi period, Neurath found himself exposed to increasing competition from Nazi politicians like Alfred Rosenberg and Joachim von Ribbentrop. In February 1938, Hitler fired Neurath and replaced him with Ribbentrop.

=== Nazi Germany ===
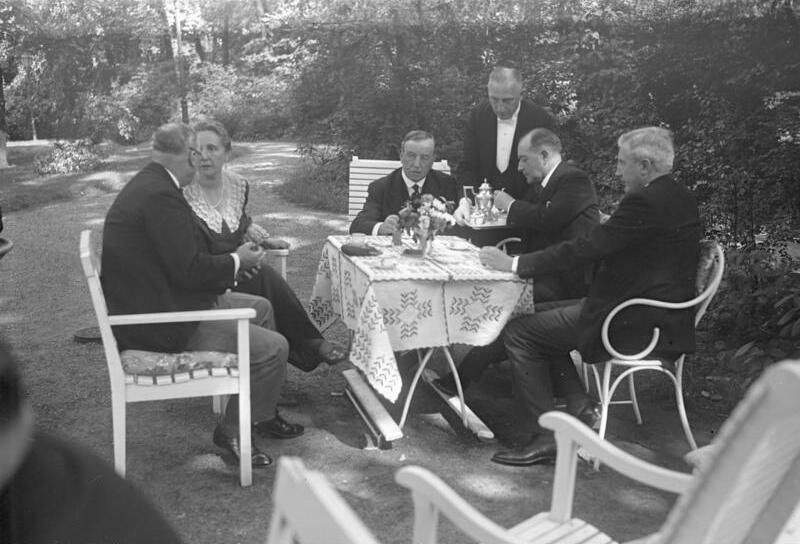
British politicians with German diplomats in the garden of the Foreign Office in July 1931

In 1933, the vast majority of the diplomats serving in the Auswärtiges Amt came from upper-class families with a disproportionate number coming from the aristocracy. The overrepresentation of aristocrats together with its overwhelming upper-class character gave the Auswärtiges Amt an elitist cachet, and made the Auswärtiges Amt into one of the most prestigious institutions in Germany. Because of its upper-class composition, the diplomats could afford extremely expensive clothes, and the men of Auswärtiges Amt were generally considered to the best dressed officials in the entire German government, contributing to the Auswärtiges Amt's glamorous, stylist image. There were no female diplomats, and besides for the women employed as secretaries, clerks and cleaners, the Auswärtiges Amt had no female employees. That the men of the Auswärtiges Amt formed an elitist group can be seen that every single diplomat had a university degree (before the 1950s, most Germans did not go to university). The requirement that one had to have a university degree to enter the Auswärtiges Amt effectively guaranteed upper-class dominance of the Auswärtiges Amt.

All of the senior diplomats in the 1930s were veterans of the struggle to win Germany "world power status" in the first years of the 20th century. Hitler's goal of making Germany into the world's greatest power was thus a foreign policy goal that the diplomats embraced quite readily. The German historian Eckart Conze stated about the overlap in viewpoints between the diplomats and the Nazis: "...the top diplomats in the Weimar Republic were opposed to a liberal political order and parliamentarianism. And then the Nazis built political and ideological bridges for them. They announced their intention to reverse the Treaty of Versailles and make the German Reich into a world power. The majority of the diplomats were able to sign their names on to such a program." In March 1933, Baron Friedrich Wilhelm von Prittwitz und Gaffron, the Ambassador to the United States, resigned on the grounds that he could not in good conscience serve the Nazi government; he was the only member of the entire Auswärtiges Amt who resigned in protest at the Nazi regime.

Officially, the men of the Auswärtiges Amt were supposed to be non-political, but in practice the diplomats formed a "quite exclusive group" with extremely conservative views and values. For these men, unconditional loyalty to the state was the highest possible value, and though the majority of the diplomats were not ideological National Socialists, they served the Nazi regime loyally until the very end. The dominance of the traditional "insiders" at the Auswärtiges Amt can be seen that every State Secretary during the Nazi era was a professional diplomat. The State Secretaries of Nazi Germany were Prince Bernhard von Bülow (State Secretary 1930–36), Count Hans Georg von Mackensen (State Secretary 1936–1938 and ambassador to Italy 1938–1942), Baron Ernst von Weizsäcker (State Secretary 1938–1943 and ambassador to the Holy See 1943–1945) and Baron Gustav Adolf Steengracht von Moyland (State Secretary 1943–1945). The overlap in goals between the professional diplomats and the Nazis were well illustrated by the memo on what should be the foreign policy of the Hitler government written by Bülow in March 1933 calling for Germany to recover the borders of 1914 and all of the lost colonies, annexation of Austria, and German domination of Eastern Europe.

During the Neurath years (1932–1938), there were very few "outsiders" allowed into the Auswärtiges Amt. Aside from Ribbentrop, who served as variously as Commissioner of Disarmament (1934–35), Extraordinary Ambassador-at-Large (1935–36), and Ambassador to Great Britain (1936–1938), the most notable of the "outsiders" were Franz von Papen (Ambassador to Austria 1934–1938 and to Turkey 1939–1944), Hans Luther (Ambassador to the United States 1933–1937), Colonel Hermann Kriebel (Consul in Shanghai 1934–1939), and General Wilhelm Faupel (Ambassador to Spain 1936–37). Most diplomats were not believers in National Socialism, but during Nazi rule, many diplomats such as Neurath himself joined the NSDAP and/or the SS as an opportunistic way of improving their career prospects; such self-interested careerism was rampant amongst the German civil service in the Nazi period. Those diplomats involved in the attempts to overthrow Hitler such as Count Ulrich von Hassell, Adam von Trott zu Solz, Count Friedrich Werner von der Schulenburg, Richard Kuenzer, Hans Bernd von Haeften, and Edmund Brücklmeir comprised a small minority of the Auswärtiges Amt. The German historian Hans-Adolf Jacobsen wrote that for those diplomats who chose to become involved in Widerstand, given that they were steeped in Prussian traditions where loyalty to the state was the highest virtue, it required "extraordinary strength of character" for them to go against everything that they had been taught to believe in.

=== Post-WWII ===
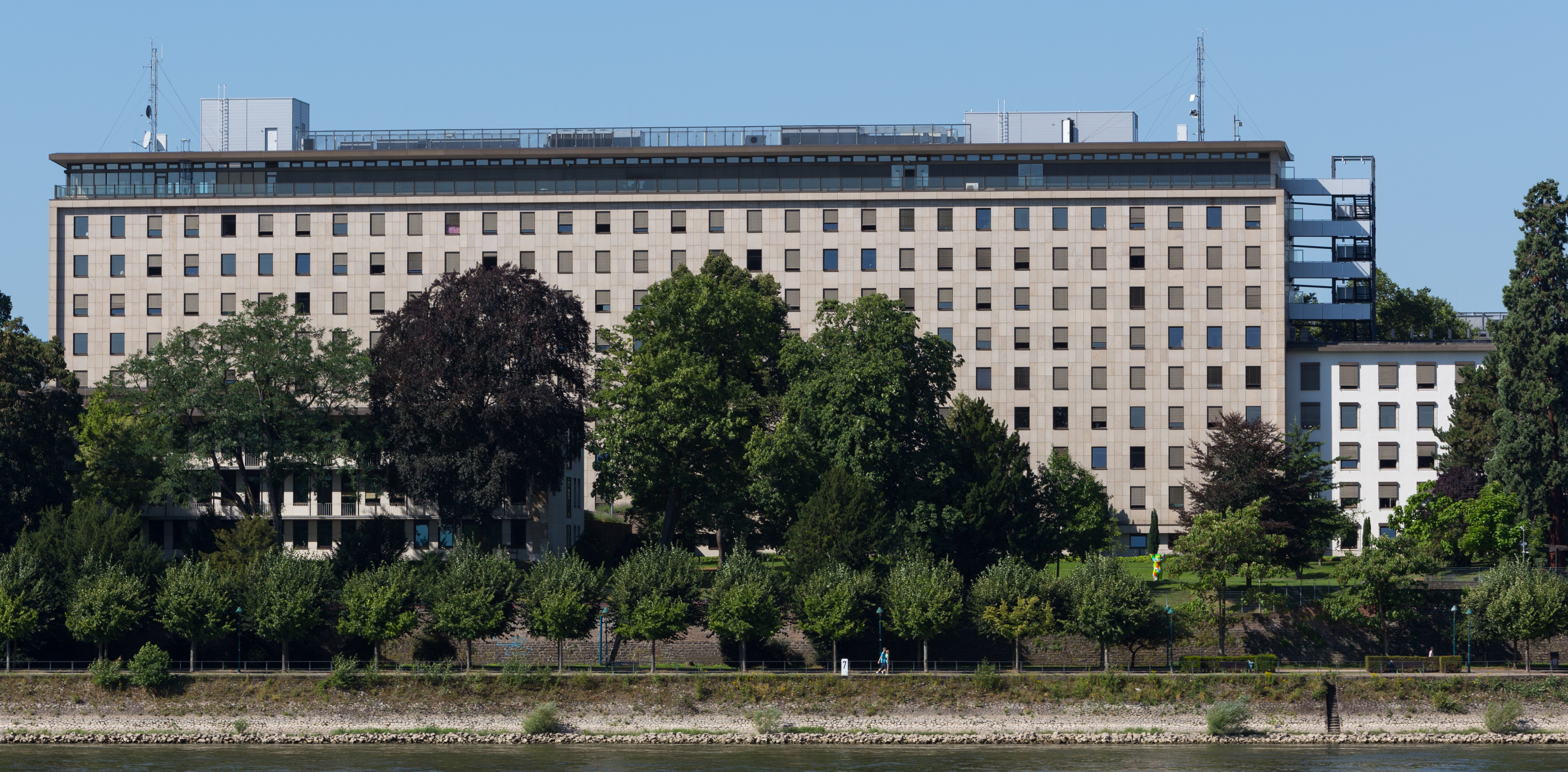
Foreign Office building in Bonn

==== Founding of the Federal Republic ====
After Germany's defeat in May 1945, the country was occupied and the German state was abolished by the Allies. The country was administered as four zones controlled respectively by the United States, the United Kingdom, France and the Soviet Union. In August 1949, a German government was reestablished in the western zones, the Federal Republic of Germany, which in its first years had very limited powers. In October 1949, the German Democratic Republic was founded in what had been the Soviet zone. Whereas Georg Dertinger had already been appointed the first minister of foreign affairs of East Germany in 1949, due to the Allied occupation statute the Auswärtiges Amt of West Germany was not reestablished until 15 March 1951.

==== Adenauer ====
Chancellor Konrad Adenauer took office as the first Foreign Minister in Bonn until he was succeeded by Heinrich von Brentano in 1955. By and large, the men who had served in the new Auswärtiges Amt were the same men who had served in the old Auswärtiges Amt. In a Bundestag debate on 23 October 1952, Adenauer admitted that 66% of the diplomats of the Auswärtiges Amt had belonged to the NSDAP, but justified their employment as: "I could not build up a Foreign Office without relying upon such skilled men". Upon Willy Brandt's taking office as Foreign Minister in the Grand coalition under Kurt Georg Kiesinger starting in 1966, the office was usually connected with the position of the Vice-Chancellor. From 1974 until 1992—with a short pause in 1982—Hans-Dietrich Genscher served as Foreign Minister and continued to champion Brandt's Ostpolitik while also playing a crucial role in the preparation of German reunification.

==== Berlin ====
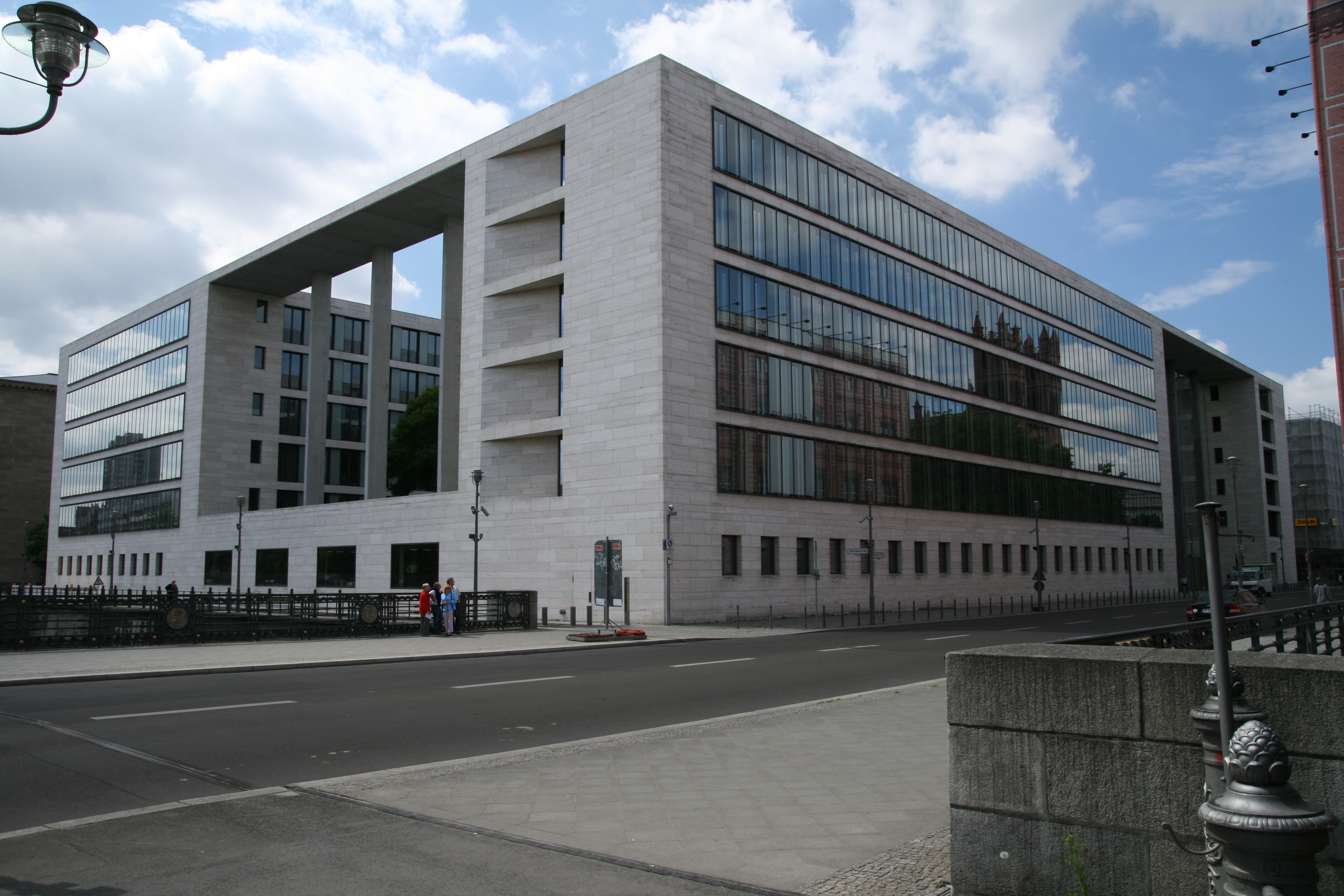
View of the Foreign Office building from Französische Straße

In 2000 the Foreign Office returned to Berlin where it took up quarters in the former Reichsbank building, which from 1959 to 1990 had served as the seat of the Central Committee of the Socialist Unity Party of Germany and was enlarged by a newly built annex. The former ministry in Bonn was retained as a secondary seat. The Foreign Office has always stressed its continuity and traditions going back to 1870.

== Further historiography and analysis ==
=== 2010 report by the historical commission ===
A report entitled The Ministry and the Past written by historians and released by the German government in October 2010 shows that wartime-era diplomats played an important role in assisting the Nazis in carrying out the Holocaust, and disproved the claim often made after 1945 that German diplomats were "sand in the machine" who acted to moderate the actions of the Nazi regime. In a 2010 interview, the German historian Eckart Conze, who had been in charge of the committee to investigate the war-time actions of the Auswärtiges Amt, stated that the Auswärtiges Amt was a "criminal organization" that was as every bit involved in the "Final Solution of the Jewish Question" as the SS were. In another interview, Conze stated: "This document makes it clear that all officials in the Foreign Ministry—including low-level office clerks—knew about the mass persecution of Jews and were actively involved in the Holocaust. It was an open secret." In October 1941, when Franz Rademacher visited Belgrade to meet officials of the Government of National Salvation of General Milan Nedić of Serbia, he submitted an expense claim for his trip to his superiors at the Auswärtiges Amt after his return to Berlin; on his expenses claim, Rademacher described the purpose of his trip to Belgrade as the "liquidation of Jews". At the Wannsee Conference in January 1942, the Auswärtiges Amt was represented by Martin Luther, who agreed that the Auswärtiges Amt would do everything within its power to persuade the governments of neutral and allied states to hand over their Jewish populations to be exterminated. Later on in 1942, Ambassador Otto Abetz arranged for the deportation of 25,000 French Jews to the death camps in Poland while Ambassador Hanns Ludin arranged for the deportation of 50,000 Slovak Jews to the death camps. In the spring of 1944, Ambassador Edmund Veesenmayer played a key role in having 400,000 Hungarian Jews deported to Auschwitz.

=== Kolbe ===
In 2003, the French historian Lucas Delattre published a biography of Fritz Kolbe, a mid-ranking diplomat who become a spy for the American Office of Strategic Services because he believed his country deserved to lose the war on the account of the genocide it was waging against the Jews. Delattre stated that Kolbe really was a case of a diplomat being "sand in the machine" as Kolbe provided intelligence to help his country lose the war, but added sarcastically that if every German civil servant really were "sand in the machine" as almost all of them claimed to be after 1945 that Hitler would never had managed to get anything done. Diplomats like Kolbe were very much the exception, not the rule.

== German representation overseas ==
In addition to the ministry's headquarters in Berlin, Germany has established embassies and consulates around the world.

== See also ==
- Minister for Foreign Affairs (Germany)
- Cabinet of Germany
- Foreign relations of Germany
- List of diplomatic missions of Germany
- Ministry for Foreign Affairs (East Germany)
- Ambassadors of Nazi Germany

== Sources ==
- Fiebig-von Hase, Ragnhild (17 November 2003). "6 The Uses of 'friendship': The 'personal regime' of Wilhelm II and Theodore Roosevelt 1901–1909". In Mombauer, Annika; Deist, Wilhelm (eds.). The Kaiser: New Research on Wilhelm II's Role in Imperial Germany. Cambridge University Press. ISBN 978-1-139-44060-8. OCLC 57567237.
- Jacobsen, Hans-Adolf [in German] (1999). "The Structure of Nazi Foreign Policy 1933–1945". In Leitz, Christian; James, Harold (eds.). The Third Reich: The Essential Readings. London: Blackwell. ISBN 978-0-631-20700-9. OCLC 851117719.
- Röhl, John C. G. (1994) [1st pub. 1987 [Kaiser, Hof und Staat : Wilhelm II. und die deutsche Politik]]. The Kaiser and His Court: Wilhelm II and the Government of Germany. Translated by Cole, Terence. Cambridge: Cambridge University Press. ISBN 978-0-521-56504-2. OCLC 868562991.
- Hürter, Johannes; Mayer, Michael, eds. (2014). Das Auswärtige Amt in der NS-Diktatur [The German Foreign Office under National Socialism]. Schriftenreihe der Vierteljahrshefte für Zeitgeschichte, 109 (in German). De Gruyter Oldenbourg. ISBN 978-3-11-034543-8.
