= Michelle Facos =

American art historian

- Born: February 25, 1955 (age 71)
- Occupation: Professor of Art History at Indiana University, Bloomington
- Awards: Fulbright Fellowship in 1993;

Academic background
- Education: Kirkland (Hamilton) College
- Alma mater: New York University Institute of Fine Arts
- Thesis: 'Nationalism and the Nordic Imagination: Swedish Art of the 1890s' (1998)
- Doctoral advisor: Kirk Varnedoe

Michelle Facos (born February 25, 1955) is an American writer and art historian.

== Early life ==
A native of Buffalo, New York, Facos graduated from Kirkland (Hamilton) College in 1976 with a B.A. in art history and comparative literature. Upon graduation, she worked as a paralegal in New York City at Debevoise & Plimpton and White & Case.

== Academic career ==
After working as a paralegal, Facos continued her art historical studies at the New York University Institute of Fine Arts, where she studied under H.W. Janson, Robert Rosenblum, Gert Schiff and her advisor, Kirk Varnedoe. Her dissertation, inspired by the exhibition "Northern Light: Realism and Symbolism in Scandinavian Painting, 1880-1910" (The Brooklyn Museum, 1982–83), was the first doctoral dissertation on Swedish painting written by a North American; It was completed in 1989 and revised and published in 1998 as Nationalism and the Nordic Imagination: Swedish Art of the 1890s. In 1996, Dr. Facos was the only art historian and non-Scandinavian invited to join the research project Cultural Processes in Nordic Forest Communities, led by Ingar Kaldal of Trondheim University. She has lectured, taught, and written widely on the subject of Scandinavian art and culture, especially in Sweden. Her most recent books, Symbolist Art in Context and An Introduction to Nineteenth-Century Art, are read in classrooms around the globe.

Since 2015, Facos also serves as the Academic Dean and Program Director of GGE Summer School, a pre-college summer enrichment program for international high school students in Greifswald, Germany.

== Business career ==
Facos's experience of living and working in Sweden ignited a passion for Scandinavian culture and nature, which expanded into an internet business, NordArtDesign (2006–2009), selling jewelry, apparel, and handicraft inspired and made by Sweden's native Sami (Lapp) inhabitants. In 2015, she co-founded MooseBooties, LLC, a company manufacturing and selling luxury infant footwear from Scandinavian moose leather.

== Honors and awards ==
Facos received a Fulbright Fellowship in 1993, and fellowships from the Alexander von Humboldt Foundation (1996), the American-Scandinavian Foundation (2007), the Alfried Krupp Foundation (2010), and the Mercator Foundation (2015). She has received grants from the American Philosophical Society (1994) and the Hadassah-Brandeis Institute (2015). In 2006 she was a guest professor at Hamburg University, Germany, in 2013 a visiting professor at East China Normal University, Shanghai, in 2014 at Warsaw University, Poland, and in 2011/2012 and 2015 a visiting professor at Greifswald University, Germany.

Since 2012 she has been Editor-in-Chief of ARTS, an open access scholarly arts journal from MDPI.

== Books ==
- A Companion to Nineteenth-Century Art, editor (Hoboken: John Wiley & Sons, 2019)
- Symbolist Roots of Modern Art, co-editor with Thor J. Mednick (London: Ashgate, 2015)
- An Introduction to Nineteenth-Century Art (London: Routledge, 2011)
- Symbolist Art in Context (Berkeley: The University of California Press, 2009)
- Culture and National Identity in Fin-de-Siècle Europe, coeditor with Sharon Hirsh (New York: Cambridge University Press, 2003)
- Nationalism and the Nordic Imagination: Swedish Art of the 1890s (Berkeley: The University of California Press, 1998) According to WorldCat, the book is held in 1761 libraries
