= Friedrich Mauz =

German psychiatrist involved in Nazi euthansia (1900–1979)

Friedrich Robert Mauz (1 May 1900 Esslingen – 7 July 1979 Münster) was a German psychiatrist who was involved in the Aktion T4 euthanasia program. From 1939 until 1945, Mauz was the Professor of Psychiatry at Albertina University in Königsberg. In 1953, he became the Professor of Psychiatry at Münster.

He was the president (1957–1958) of the German Society for Psychiatrists and Neurologists. Mauz was father of three children, one son and two daughters. His son Gerhard Mauz (1925–2003) was a court reporter for Der Spiegel magazine.

== Early life and education ==
Mauz studied medicine at the universities of Tübingen, Freiburg and Würzburg, passed the state medical examination at Tübingen in December 1923. He received his doctorate in medicine from University of Tübingen. He completed his practical medical training at the Katharinenhospital in Stuttgart between January and May 1924 and received his medical license in July 1924. From 1922 to 1923 he had served as a research assistant at a psychiatric clinic of the University of Tübingen under Robert Group and worked as an assistant physician there until June 1 11926.

== Career ==
He was an assistant physician at the university psychiatrics clinic in Marburg, becoming senior physician in 1927. He completed his habilitation in psychiatry and neurology at the University of Marburg on March 1928 and served there as private lecturer until 1934.

== See also ==
- Psychiatry
- Racial policy of Nazi Germany
- Aktion T4
