= Eckart Conze =

German historian, author, and professor

Dr. Eckart Conze
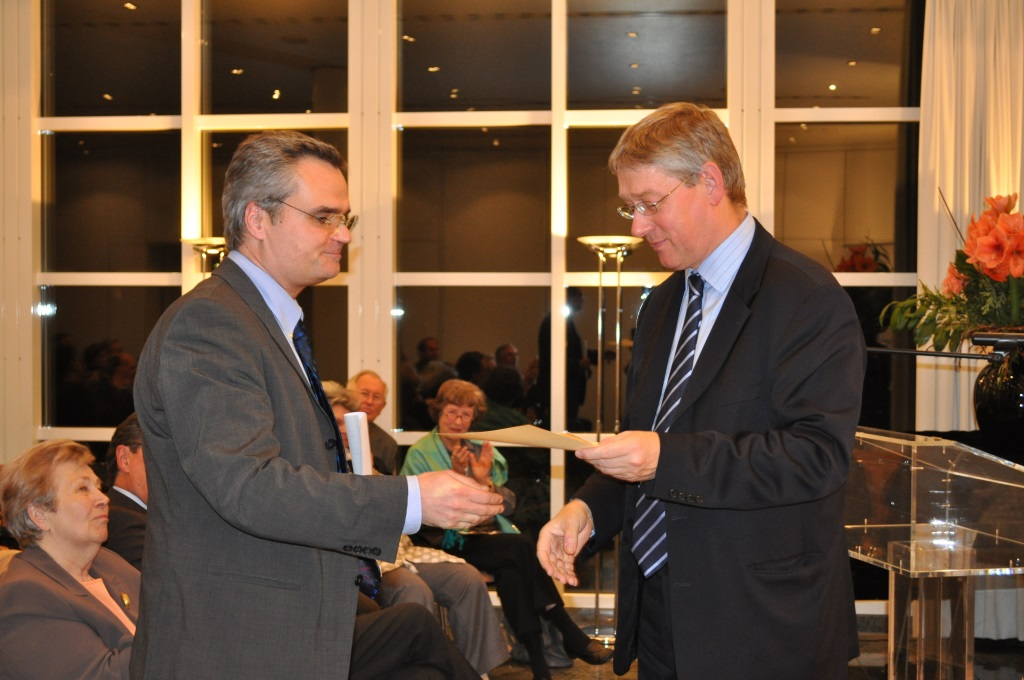
- Volker Stalmann (left) presenting Conze with the Wolf Erich Kellner Prize, 2011.
- Born: October 17, 1963 (age 63); Coburg, Bavaria
- Education: University of Marburg
- Writing career
- Language: German (primary); English

Dr. Eckart Conze (born October 17, 1963) is a German historian, author, and professor of modern history at the University of Marburg in Hesse.

He has authored and co-authored more than thirty books and papers on modern German, European and international history, including works in English published by Cambridge University Press. His interviews and writing have appeared in German news magazine Der Spiegel.

His book The Search for Security (German: Die Suche nach Sicherheit) garnered him the prize for promoting the translation of humanities works by the Börsenverein des Deutschen Buchhandels in 2009.

He was a member of the Independent Commission of Historians, tasked by the German Federal Foreign Office in 2005 to study the conduct of German diplomats in Nazi Germany and in the Federal Republic. The commission published its findings on October 21, 2010, in a book entitled The Office and the Past (German: Das Amt und die Vergangenheit).

He is the deputy chairperson of the board of trustees of the Wolf-Erich-Kellner Memorial Foundation, commemorating its namesake German historian, archivist, and FDP politician.

== Literature ==
- Die gaullistische Herausforderung. Die deutsch-französischen Beziehungen in der amerikanischen Europapolitik [The Gaullistic Challenge: German-Franco Relations in American-European Policy] (in German). Munich: University of Erlangen–Nuremberg. 1995. ISBN 3-486-56106-5.
- Von deutschem Adel. Die Grafen von Bernstorff im zwanzigsten Jahrhundert [From German Nobility: The Counts of Bernstorff in the Twentieth Century] (in German). Stuttgart: Deutsche Verlags-Anstalt. 2000. ISBN 3-421-05344-8.
- Die Suche nach Sicherheit. Eine Geschichte der Bundesrepublik von 1949 bis in die Gegenwart [The Search for Security: A History of the Federal Republic From 1949 to the Present] (in German). Munich: Siedler. 2009. ISBN 978-3-88680-919-6.
- Geschichte der Sicherheit. Entwicklung – Themen – Perspektiven [History of Security. Development – Themes – Perspectives.] (in German). Göttingen: Vandenhoeck & Ruprecht. 2017. ISBN 978-3-525-30094-7.
- Die große Illusion. Versailles 1919 und die Neuordnung der Welt [The Great Illusion. Versailles 1919 and the Reorganisation of the World] (in German). Munich: Siedler. 2018. ISBN 978-3-8275-0055-7.
