= Gerhard Mauz =

Gerhard Mauz (November 29, 1925 in Tübingen – August 15, 2003 in Reinbek) was a German journalist and correspondent for judicial processes.

Mauz was the son of T4-Gutachter Friedrich Mauz (1900-1979). He studied psychology, psychopathology and philosophy; he began his career at Die Welt. From 1964 till his retirement 1990 he was a member of the staff of Der Spiegel. He wrote about legal proceedings in post-war Germany.

In 1973 he received the Bundesverdienstkreuz am Bande (Order of Merit of the Federal Republic of Germany).

== Publications ==
- Die großen Prozesse der Bundesrepublik Deutschland. Springe: zu Klampen 2005, ISBN 3-934920-36-5.
- Die Justiz vor Gericht: Macht und Ohnmacht der Richter. C. Bertelsmann, 1990. ISBN 978-3-570-02417-1.
