= Pratt =

Pratt is an English surname. Notable people with the surname include:

== A–F ==
- Abner Pratt (1801–1863), American diplomat, jurist, politician, and lawyer
- Al Pratt (baseball) (1847–1937), American baseball player
- Andy Pratt (baseball) (born 1979), American baseball player
- Andy Pratt (singer-songwriter) (born 1947), American singer-songwriter and musician
- Ann Pratt (born c. 1830), Jamaican author about Kingston Lunatic Asylum
- Antwerp Edgar Pratt (1852–1924), British naturalist, explorer, collector of plants and animals
- Awadagin Pratt (born 1966), American concert pianist
- Babe Pratt (Walter Peter Pratt, 1916–1988), Canadian ice hockey player
- Bela Pratt (1867–1917), American sculptor
- Betty Rosenquest Pratt (1925–2016), American tennis player
- Bob Pratt (1912–2001), Australian rules footballer
- Caleb S. Pratt (1832–1861), Union Army officer
- Calvin Edward Pratt (1828–1896), Union Army officer
- Charles Pratt, 1st Earl Camden (1713–1794), British lawyer
- Charles Pratt (1830–1891), American businessman and philanthropist
- Chris Pratt (born 1979), American actor
- Christopher Pratt (1935–2022), Canadian artist
- Daniel Pratt (disambiguation), multiple people
- David Pratt (disambiguation), multiple people
- Denis Charles Pratt (1908–1999), British writer, illustrator, actor, and artist's model, commonly known as Quentin Crisp
- Don Pratt (1892–1944), United States Army officer
- Dudley Pratt (1897–1975), American sculptor
- E. J. Pratt (1882–1964), Canadian poet
- Edmund T. Pratt Jr. (1927–2002), American CEO
- Eliza Jane Pratt (1902–1981), American politician
- Enoch Pratt (1808–1896), American businessman
- Eugene E. Pratt (c. 1892–1970), justice of the Utah Supreme Court
- Fletcher Pratt (1897–1956), historian and science fiction/fantasy author
- Francis A. Pratt (1827–1902), American engineer, of the Pratt & Whitney aircraft engine company
- Frederick Haven Pratt (1873–1958), American professor of physiology

== G–J ==
- Gary Pratt (born 1981), English cricketer
- George Pratt (disambiguation), multiple people
- Germaine Pratt (born 1998), American football player
- Greta Pratt (born 1960), American photographer
- Harold Douglas Pratt Jr. (born 1944), American ornithologist, bio acoustician, wildlife photographer, bird illustrator, and musician
- Harry H. Pratt (1864–1932), U.S. Representative from New York
- Harry Rogers Pratt (1886–1956), American professor of music and drama
- Harvey Pratt (1941–2025), American forensic and Native American artist
- Henry Pratt (disambiguation), multiple people
- Herbert L. Pratt (1871–1945), American oil industrialist
- Hiram Pratt (1800–1840), American politician from Buffalo, New York
- Hodgson Pratt (1824–1907), British pacifist
- Hugo Pratt (1927–1995), Italian cartoonist
- Jane Pratt (born 1962), American magazine editor
- Jerome Pratt (1926–1984), American politician
- Jess Pratt (born 1997), American-born Australian racing cyclist
- Jessica Pratt (disambiguation), multiple people
- John Pratt (disambiguation), multiple people
- Joseph Marmaduke Pratt (1891–1946), American politician
- Judson Pratt (1916–2002), American actor

== K–Q ==
- Keith Pratt (born 1938), British academic, historian, and author
- Keri Lynn Pratt (born 1978), American actress
- Khevin Pratt (born 1970), American football player
- Kyla Pratt (born c. 1985), American actress
- Larry Pratt (born 1942), American lobbyist
- Larry Pratt (baseball) (1887–1969), American baseball player
- Lawton Leroy Pratt (1886–1943), American businessman, mortician, and funeral director
- Loftin K. Pratt (died 1846), American politician and judge from North Carolina
- Lorus Pratt (1855–1923), American artist
- Louise Pratt (born 1972), Australian politician
- Marvin Pratt (born 1944), American politician
- Mary Pratt (disambiguation), multiple people
- Matthew Pratt (1734–1805), American painter
- Mike or Michael Pratt (disambiguation), multiple people
- Minnie Bruce Pratt (1946–2023), American educator, activist and essayist
- Neisha Pratt (born 1973), Hong Kong cricketer
- Nicole Pratt (born 1973), Australian tennis player
- Nolan Pratt (born 1975), Canadian ice hockey player and assistant coach
- Oliver Pratt (born 2004), English rugby league player
- Orson Pratt (1811–1881), Latter Day Saint leader, brother of Parley P. Pratt
- Parley P. Pratt (1807–1857), Latter Day Saint writer, brother of Orson Pratt
- Percy Pratt (1874–1961), New Zealand cricketer
- Peter Pratt (1923–1995), British actor
- Phil Pratt (born 1942), Jamaican singer and record producer
- Phineas Pratt (born c. 1593, died 1680), early New England settler

== R–Z ==
- Renée Gill Pratt (born 1954), American politician and convicted felon
- Rachael Pratt (1874–1954), Australian army nurse
- Rey Pratt (1878–1931), Latter Day Saint leader in Mexico
- Richard Pratt (disambiguation), multiple people
- Robert Pratt (1870–1935), Canadian settler
- Rodney Pratt (born 1938), English cricketer
- Roger Pratt (architect) (1620–1684), English architect
- Samuel Pratt (1807–c. 1875), American farmer and politician
- Samuel Pratt (priest) (died 1723), Anglican Canon of Windsor and Dean of Rochester
- Samuel Jackson Pratt (1749–1814), English writer
- Sharon Pratt Kelly (born 1944), American politician
- Silas G. Pratt (1846–1916), American composer
- Spencer Pratt (born 1983), American television personality
- Stephen Turnham Pratt, American Chemist
- Susan May Pratt (born 1974), American actress
- Susan Pratt (born 1956), American actress
- Thane K. Pratt (born 1950), American wildlife biologist
- Theodore Pratt (1901–1969), American novelist
- Thomas Pratt (disambiguation), numerous people
- Tim Pratt (born 1976), American science fiction and fantasy writer and poet
- Todd Pratt (born 1967), American baseball player, manager, and coach
- Tom Pratt (baseball) (1844–1908), professional baseball player for the Philadelphia Athletics
- Tom Pratt (American football) (born 1935), American football player and coach
- Tom Pratt (footballer, born 1873) (1873–1935), English footballer
- Tom Pratt (footballer, born 1995), English footballer
- Tommy Pratt (1905–1992), Australian footballer
- Travis Pratt, American criminologist
- Vaughan Pratt (born 1944), computer scientist
- Victoria Pratt (born 1970), Canadian actress
- Wallace Pratt (1885–1981), American geologist
- Walter F. Pratt (born 1946), American legal scholar
- Walter L. Pratt (1868–1934), New York politician
- William Pratt (disambiguation), numerous people
- Zadock Pratt (1790–1871), US congressman and founder of Prattsville, New York

== Fictional characters ==
- Atom (Al Pratt), a comics character
- George Pratt, in Philip Van Doren Stern's short story "The Greatest Gift"
- Greg Pratt, in the television series ER
- Kyle Pratt, heroine of the 2005 film Flightplan, played by Jodie Foster
- Michaela Pratt, in the television series How to Get Away with Murder
- Upson Pratt in the movie Creepshow
- William Pratt or Spike, in Buffy the Vampire Slayer
- Mrs. Pratt, in Vladimir Nabokov's novel Lolita

== See also ==
- Killing of Olivia Pratt-Korbel
- Tierra Ruffin-Pratt (born 1991), American basketball player
- Pratz (disambiguation)
