= Lunatic asylum =

Historical confinement for mentally ill people

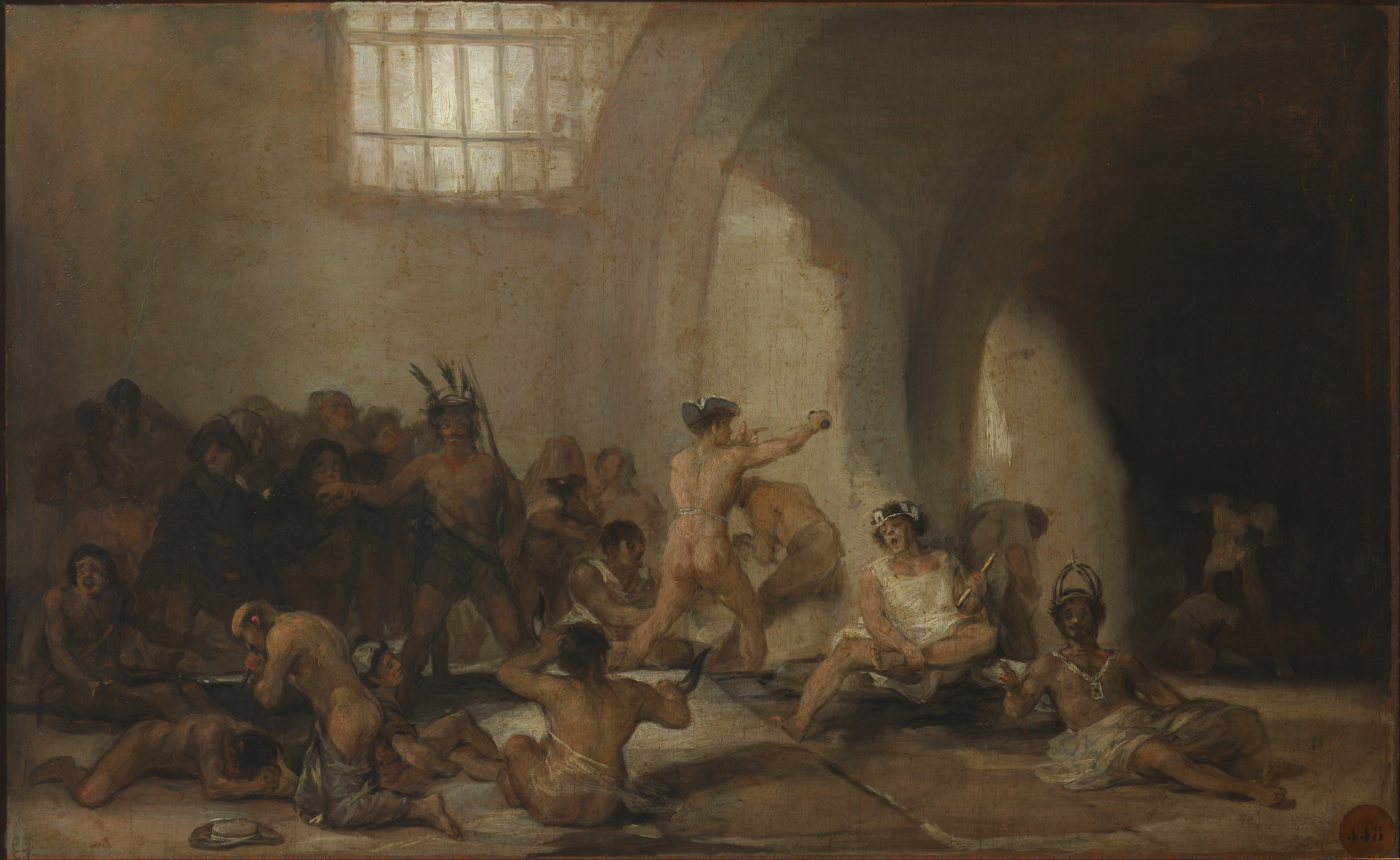
Social alienation was one of the main themes in Francisco Goya's masterpieces, such as The Madhouse (above).

The lunatic asylum, insane asylum or mental asylum was an institution where people with mental illness were confined. It was an early precursor of the modern psychiatric hospital.

Modern psychiatric hospitals evolved from and eventually replaced the older lunatic asylum. The treatment of inmates in early lunatic asylums was sometimes brutal and focused on containment and restraint. The discovery of anti-psychotic drugs and mood-stabilizing drugs resulted in a shift in focus from containment in lunatic asylums to treatment in psychiatric hospitals. Later, there was further and more thorough critique in the form of the deinstitutionalization movement which focuses on treatment at home or in less isolated institutions.

Whilst it was used in the past, modern and more humane areas have been developed as opposed to the methods of isolation and questionable therapies used in lunatic (insane) asylums.

== History ==
=== Medieval era ===
In the Islamic world, the Bimaristans were described by European travellers, who wrote about their wonder at the care and kindness shown to lunatics. In 872, Ahmad ibn Tulun built a hospital in Cairo that provided care to the insane, which included music therapy. Nonetheless, British historian of medicine Roy Porter cautioned against idealising the role of hospitals generally in medieval Islam, stating that "They were a drop in the ocean for the vast population that they had to serve, and their true function lay in highlighting ideals of compassion and bringing together the activities of the medical profession."

In Europe during the medieval era, a small subsection of the population of those considered mad were housed in a variety of institutional settings. Mentally ill people were often held captive in cages or kept up within the city walls, or they were compelled to amuse members of courtly society. Porter gives examples of such locales where some of the insane were cared for, such as in monasteries. A few towns had towers where madmen were kept (called Narrentürme in German, or "fools' towers"). The ancient Parisian hospital Hôtel-Dieu also had a small number of cells set aside for lunatics, whilst the town of Elbing boasted a madhouse, the Tollhaus, attached to the Teutonic Knights' hospital. Dave Sheppard's Development of Mental Health Law and Practice begins in 1285 with a case that linked "the instigation of the devil" with being "frantic and mad".

In Spain, other such institutions for the insane were established after the Christian Reconquista; facilities included hospitals in Valencia (1407), Zaragoza (1425), Seville (1436), Barcelona (1481) and Toledo (1483). In London, England, the Priory of Saint Mary of Bethlehem, which later became known more notoriously as Bedlam, was founded in 1247. At the start of the 15th century, it housed six insane men. The former lunatic asylum, Het Dolhuys, established in the 16th century in Haarlem, the Netherlands, has been adapted as a museum of psychiatry, with an overview of treatments from the origins of the building up to the 1990s.

=== Emergence of public lunatic asylums ===
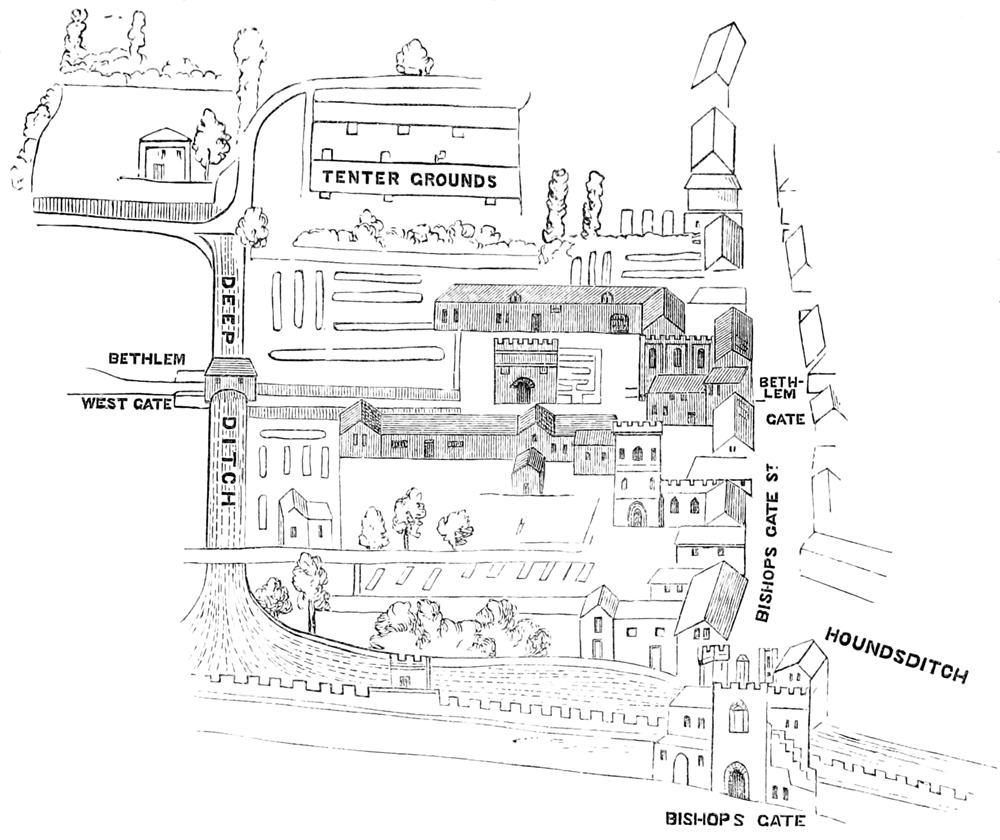
Plan of the Bethlem Royal Hospital, an early public asylum for the mentally ill

The level of specialist institutional provision for the care and control of the insane remained extremely limited at the turn of the 18th century. Madness was seen principally as a domestic problem, with families and parish authorities in Europe and England central to regimens of care. Various forms of outdoor relief were extended by the parish authorities to families in these circumstances, including financial support, the provision of parish nurses and, where family care was not possible, lunatics might be 'boarded out' to other members of the local community or committed to private madhouses. Exceptionally, if those deemed mad were judged to be particularly disturbing or violent, parish authorities might meet the considerable costs of their confinement in charitable asylums such as Bethlem, in Houses of Correction or in workhouses.

In the late 17th century, this model began to change, and privately run asylums for the insane began to proliferate and expand in size. Already in 1632 it was recorded that Bethlem Royal Hospital, London had "below stairs a parlor, a kitchen, two larders, a long entry throughout the house, and 21 rooms wherein the poor distracted people lie, and above the stairs eight rooms more for servants and the poor to lie in". Inmates who were deemed dangerous or disturbing were chained, but Bethlem was an otherwise open building. Its inhabitants could roam around its confines and possibly throughout the general neighborhood in which the hospital was situated. In 1676, Bethlem expanded into newly built premises at Moorfields with a capacity for 100 inmates.

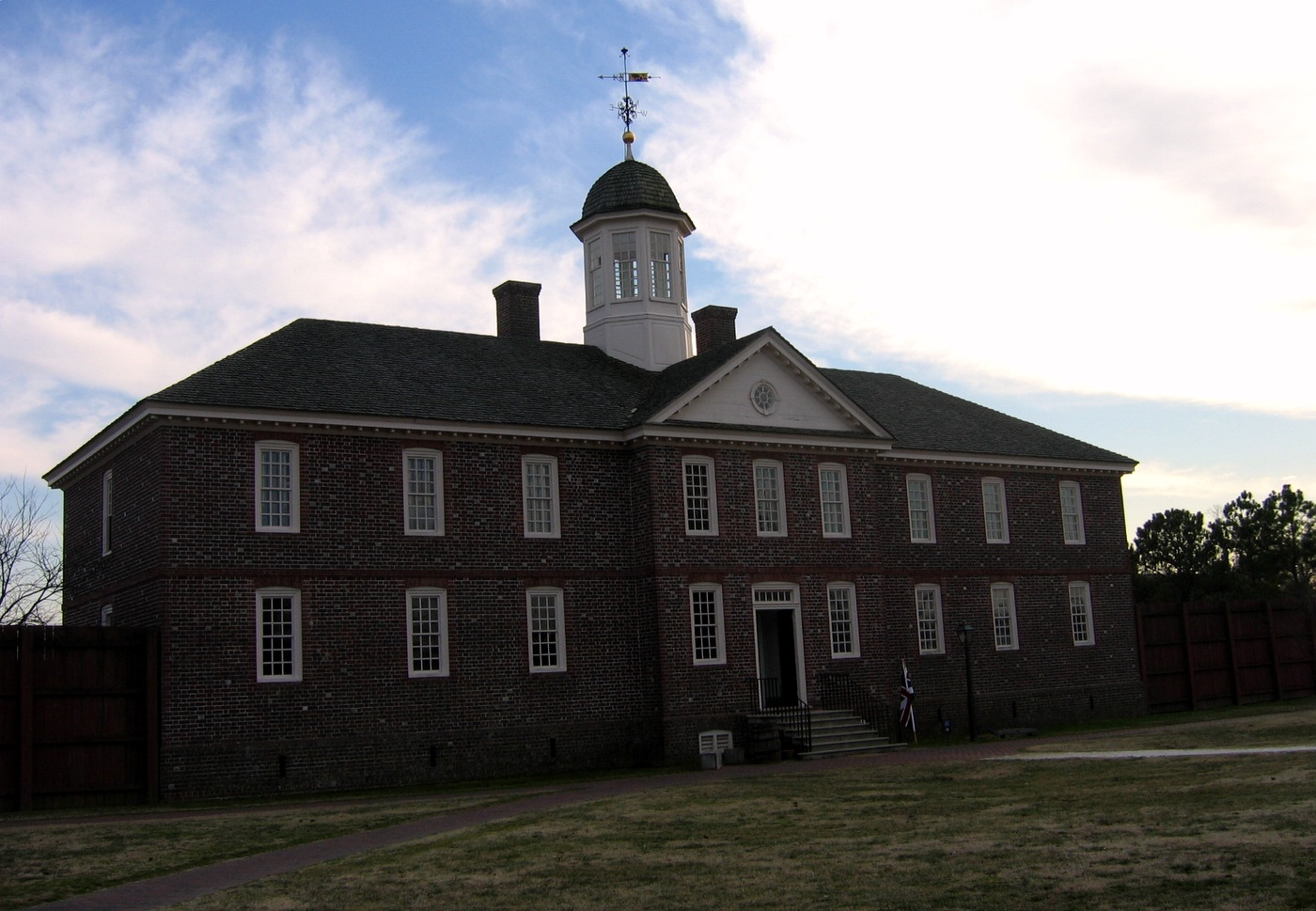
Eastern State Hospital was the first psychiatric institution to be founded in the United States.

A second public charitable institution was opened in 1713. Known as the Bethel in Norwich, it was a small facility which generally housed between twenty and thirty inmates. In 1728 at Guy's Hospital, London, wards were established for chronic lunatics. From the mid-eighteenth century the number of public charitably funded asylums expanded moderately with the opening of St Luke's Hospital in 1751 in Upper Moorfields, London; the establishment in 1765 of the Hospital for Lunatics at Newcastle upon Tyne; the Manchester Lunatic Hospital, which opened in 1766; the York Asylum in 1777 (not to be confused with the York Retreat); the Leicester Lunatic Asylum (1794), and the Liverpool Lunatic Asylum (1797).

A similar expansion took place in the British American colonies. The Pennsylvania Hospital was founded in Philadelphia in 1751 as a result of work begun in 1709 by the Religious Society of Friends. A portion of this hospital was set apart for the mentally ill, and the first patients were admitted in 1752. Virginia is recognized as the first state to establish an institution for the mentally ill. Eastern State Hospital, located in Williamsburg, Virginia, was incorporated in 1768 under the name of the "Public Hospital for Persons of Insane and Disordered Minds" and its first patients were admitted in 1773.

==== Trade in lunacy ====
There was no centralised state response to "madness" in society in century Britain until the 19th century, however private madhouses proliferated there in the 18th century on a scale unseen elsewhere. References to such institutions are limited for the 17th century but it is evident that by the start of the 18th century, the so-called 'trade in lunacy' was well established. Daniel Defoe, an ardent critic of private madhouses, estimated in 1724 that there were fifteen then operating in the London area. Defoe may have exaggerated but exact figures for private metropolitan madhouses are available only from 1774, when licensing legislation was introduced: sixteen institutions were recorded. At least two of these, Hoxton House and Wood's Close, Clerkenwell, had been in operation since the 17th century. By 1807, the number had increased to seventeen. This limited growth in the number of London madhouses is believed likely to reflect the fact that vested interests, especially the College of Physicians, exercised considerable control in preventing new entrants to the market. Thus, rather than there being a proliferation of private madhouses in London, existing institutions tended to expand considerably in size. The establishments which increased most during the 18th century, such as Hoxton House, did so by accepting pauper patients rather than private, middle class, fee-paying patients. Significantly, pauper patients, unlike their private counterparts, were not subject to inspection under the 1774 legislation.

Fragmentary evidence indicates that some provincial madhouses existed in Britain from at least the 17th century and possibly earlier. A madhouse at Kingsdown, Box, Wiltshire was opened during the 17th century. Further locales of early businesses include one at Guildford in Surrey which was accepting patients by 1700, one at Fonthill Gifford in Wiltshire from 1718, another at Hook Norton in Oxfordshire from about 1725, one at St Albans dating from around 1740, and a madhouse at Fishponds in Bristol from 1766. It is likely that many of these provincial madhouses, as was the case with the exclusive Ticehurst House, may have evolved from householders who were boarding lunatics on behalf of parochial authorities and later formalised this practice into a business venture. The vast majority were small in scale with only seven asylums outside London with in excess of thirty patients by 1800 and somewhere between ten and twenty institutions had fewer patients than this.

=== Humanitarian reform ===
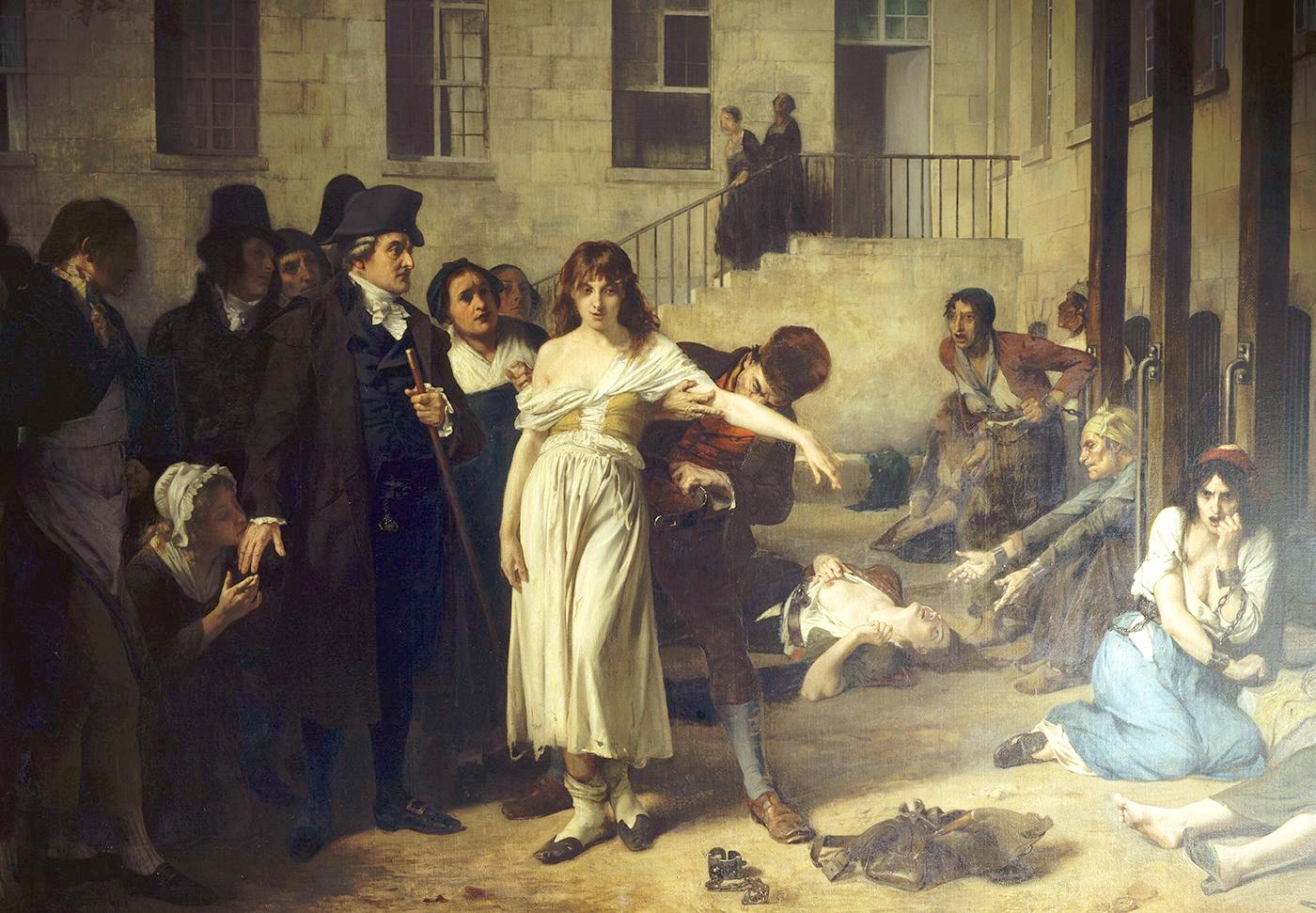
Dr. Philippe Pinel at the Salpêtrière, 1795 by Tony Robert-Fleury. Pinel ordering the removal of chains from patients at the Paris asylum for insane women.

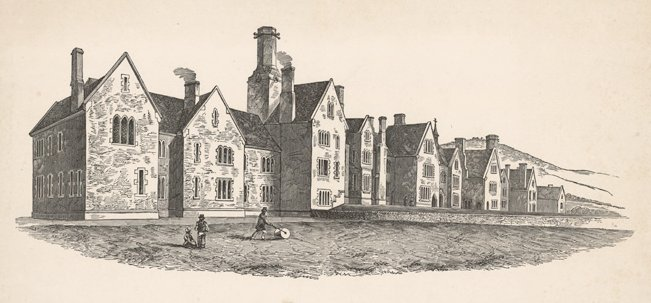
The joint counties' lunatic asylum, erected at Abergavenny, 1850

During the Age of Enlightenment, attitudes began to change, in particular among the educated classes in Western Europe. "Mental illness" came to be viewed as a disorder that required some form of compassionate but clinical, "rational" treatment that would aid in the rehabilitation of the patient into a rational being. When the ruling monarch of the United Kingdom, George III, who had a mental disorder, experienced a remission in 1789, mental illness came to be seen as something which could be treated and cured. The introduction of moral treatment was initiated independently by the French doctor Philippe Pinel and the English Quaker William Tuke.

In 1792, Pinel became the chief physician at the Bicêtre Hospital in Le Kremlin-Bicêtre, near Paris. Before his arrival, inmates were chained in cramped cell-like rooms where there was poor ventilation, led by a man named Jackson 'Brutis' Taylor. Taylor was then killed by the inmates leading to Pinel's leadership. In 1797, Jean-Baptiste Pussin, the "governor" of mental patients at Bicêtre, first freed patients of their chains and banned physical punishment, although straitjackets could be used instead. Patients were allowed to move freely about the hospital grounds, and eventually dark dungeons were replaced with sunny, well-ventilated rooms. Pinel argued that mental illness was the result of excessive exposure to social and psychological stresses, to heredity and physiological damage.

Pussin and Pinel's approach was seen as remarkably successful, and they later brought similar reforms to a mental hospital in Paris for female patients, La Salpetrière. Pinel's student and successor, Jean Esquirol, went on to help establish 10 new mental hospitals that operated on the same principles. There was an emphasis on the selection and supervision of attendants in order to establish a suitable setting to facilitate psychological work, and particularly on the employment of ex-patients as they were thought most likely to refrain from inhumane treatment while being able to stand up to patients' pleas, menaces, or complaints.

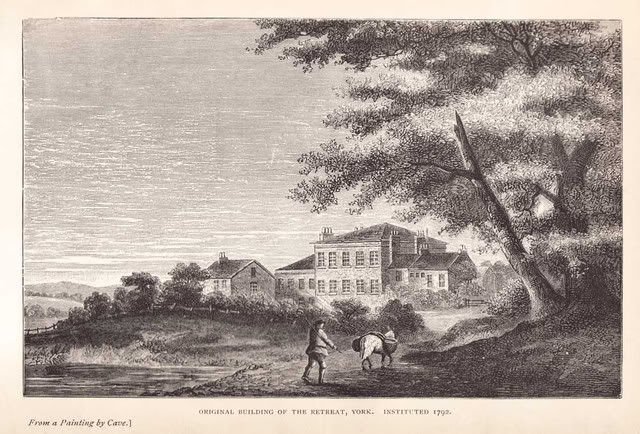
The York Retreat (c. 1796) was built by William Tuke, a pioneer of moral treatment for the insane.

William Tuke led the development of a radical new type of institution in Northern England, following the death of a fellow Quaker in a local asylum in 1790. In 1796, with the help of fellow Quakers and others, he founded the York Retreat, where eventually about 30 patients lived as part of a small community in a quiet country house and engaged in a combination of rest, talk, and manual work. Rejecting medical theories and techniques, the efforts of the York Retreat centred around minimising restraints and cultivating rationality and moral strength.

The entire Tuke family became known as founders of moral treatment. They created a family-style ethos, and patients performed chores to give them a sense of contribution. There was a daily routine of both work and leisure time. If patients behaved well, they were rewarded; if they behaved poorly, there was some minimal use of restraints or instilling of fear. The patients were told that treatment depended on their conduct. In this sense, the patient's moral autonomy was recognised. William Tuke's grandson, Samuel Tuke, published an influential work in the early 19th century on the methods of the retreat; Pinel's Treatise on Insanity had by then been published, and Samuel Tuke translated his term as "moral treatment". Tuke's Retreat became a model throughout the world for humane and moral treatment of patients with mental disorders.

The York Retreat inspired similar institutions in the United States, most notably the Brattleboro Retreat and the Hartford Retreat (now the Institute of Living). Benjamin Rush of Philadelphia also promoted humane treatment of the insane outside dungeons and without iron restraints, as well as sought their reintegration into society. In 1792, Rush successfully campaigned for a separate ward for the insane at the Pennsylvania Hospital. His talk-based approach could be considered as a rudimentary form of modern occupational therapy, although most of his physical approaches have long been discredited, such as bleeding and purging, hot and cold baths, mercury pills, a "tranquilizing chair" and gyroscope.

A similar reform was carried out in Italy by Vincenzo Chiarugi, who discontinued the use of chains on the inmates in the early 19th century. In the town of Interlaken, Johann Jakob Guggenbühl started a retreat for mentally disabled children in 1841.

==== Institutionalisation ====
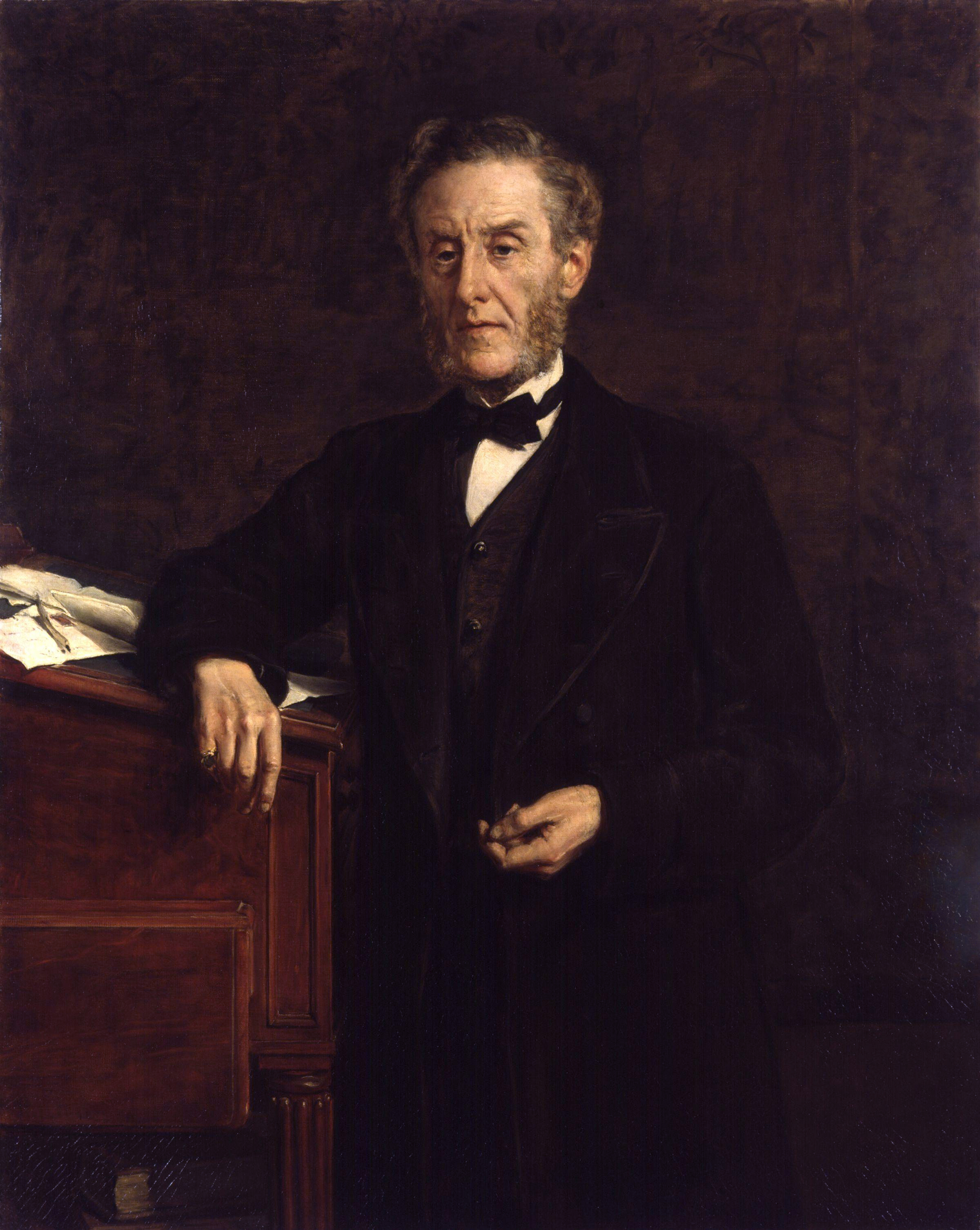
Anthony Ashley-Cooper, 7th Earl of Shaftesbury, a vigorous campaigner for the reform of lunacy law in England, and the Head of the Lunacy Commission for 40 years

The modern era of institutionalized provision for the care of the mentally ill, began in the early 19th century with a large state-led effort. Public mental asylums were established in Britain after the passing of the 1808 County Asylums Act. This empowered magistrates to build rate-supported asylums in every county to house the many 'pauper lunatics'. Nine counties first applied, and the first public asylum opened in 1811 in Nottinghamshire. Parliamentary Committees were established to investigate abuses at private madhouses like Bethlem Hospital – its officers were eventually dismissed and national attention was focused on the routine use of bars, chains and handcuffs and the filthy conditions the inmates lived in. However, it was not until 1828 that the newly appointed Commissioners in Lunacy were empowered to license and supervise private asylums.

The Lunacy Act 1845 was an important landmark in the treatment of the mentally ill, as it explicitly changed the status of mentally ill people to patients who required treatment. The Act created the Lunacy Commission, headed by Lord Shaftesbury, to focus on lunacy legislation reform. The commission was made up of eleven Metropolitan Commissioners who were required to carry out the provisions of the Act: the compulsory construction of asylums in every county, with regular inspections on behalf of the Home Secretary. All asylums were required to have written regulations and to have a resident qualified physician. A national body for asylum superintendents – the Medico-Psychological Association – was established in 1866 under the Presidency of William A. F. Browne, although the body appeared in an earlier form in 1841.

In 1838, France enacted a law to regulate both the admissions into asylums and asylum services across the country. Édouard Séguin developed a systematic approach for training individuals with mental deficiencies, and, in 1839, he opened the first school for the "severely retarded". His method of treatment was based on the assumption that the "mentally deficient" did not suffer from disease.

In the United States, the erection of state asylums began with the first law for the creation of one in New York, passed in 1842. The Utica State Hospital was opened approximately in 1850. The creation of this hospital, as of many others, was largely the work of Dorothea Lynde Dix, whose philanthropic efforts extended over many states, and in Europe as far as Constantinople. Many state hospitals in the United States were built in the 1850s and 1860s on the Kirkbride Plan, an architectural style meant to have curative effect.

Looking into the late 19th and early 20th century history of the Homewood Retreat of Guelph, Ontario, and the context of commitments to asylums in North America and Great Britain, Cheryl Krasnick Warsh states that "the kin of asylum patients were, in fact, the major impetus behind commitment, but their motivations were based not so much upon greed as upon the internal dynamics of the family, and upon the economic structure of western society in the 19th and early 20th centuries."

==== Women in psychiatric institutions ====
Based on her study of cases from the Homewood Retreat, Cheryl Krasnick Warsh concludes that "the realities of the household in late Victorian and Edwardian middle class society rendered certain elements—socially redundant women in particular—more susceptible to institutionalization than others."

In the 18th to the early 20th century, women were sometimes institutionalised due to their opinions, their unruliness and their inability to be controlled properly by a primarily male-dominated culture. There were financial incentives too; before the passage of the Married Women's Property Act 1882, all of a wife's assets passed automatically to her husband.

The men who were in charge of these women, either a husband, father or brother, could send these women to mental institutions, stating that they believed that these women were mentally ill because of their strong opinions. "Between the years of 1850–1900, women were placed in mental institutions for behaving in ways the male society did not agree with." These men had the last say when it came to the mental health of these women, so if they believed that these women were mentally ill, or if they simply wanted to silence the voices and opinions of these women, they could easily send them to mental institutions. This was an easy way to render them vulnerable and submissive.

An early fictional example is Mary Wollstonecraft's posthumously published novel Maria: or, The Wrongs of Woman (1798), in which the title character is confined to an insane asylum when she becomes inconvenient to her husband. Real women's stories reached the public through court cases: Louisa Nottidge was abducted by male relatives to prevent her committing her inheritance and her life to live in a revivalist clergyman's intentional community. Wilkie Collins based his 1859 novel The Woman in White on this case, dedicating it to Bryan Procter, the Commissioner for Lunacy. A generation later, Rosina Bulwer Lytton, daughter of the women's rights advocate Anna Wheeler, was locked up by her husband Edward Bulwer-Lytton and subsequently wrote of this in A Blighted Life (1880).

In 1887, journalist Nellie Bly had herself committed to the Blackwell's Island Insane Asylum in New York City, in order to investigate conditions there. Her account was published in the New York World newspaper, and in book form as Ten Days in a Mad-House.

In 1902, Margarethe von Ende, wife of the German arms manufacturer Friedrich Alfred Krupp, was consigned to an insane asylum by Kaiser Wilhelm II, a family friend, when she asked him to respond to reports of her husband's gay orgies on Capri.

==== New practices ====
In continental Europe, universities often played a part in the administration of the asylums. In Germany, many practising psychiatrists were educated in universities associated with particular asylums. However, because Germany remained a loosely bound conglomerate of individual states, it lacked a national regulatory framework for asylums.

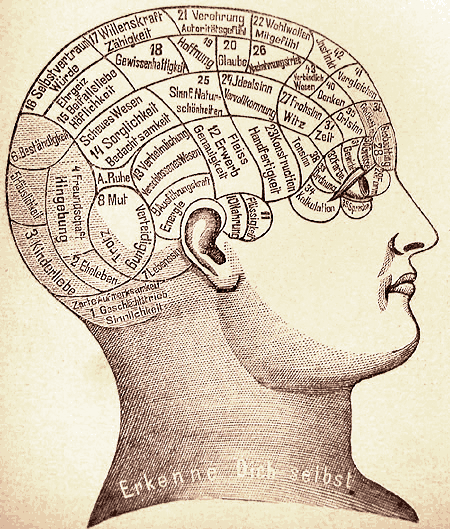
William A. F. Browne was an influential reformer of the lunatic asylum in the mid-19th century, and an advocate of the new 'science' of phrenology.

Although Tuke, Pinel and others had tried to do away with physical restraint, it remained widespread in the 19th century. At the Lincoln Asylum in England, Robert Gardiner Hill, with the support of Edward Parker Charlesworth, pioneered a mode of treatment that suited "all types" of patients, so that mechanical restraints and coercion could be dispensed with—a situation he finally achieved in 1838. In 1839 Sergeant John Adams and Dr. John Conolly were impressed by the work of Hill, and introduced the method into their Hanwell Asylum, by then the largest in the country. Hill's system was adapted, since Conolly was unable to supervise each attendant as closely as Hill had done. By September 1839, mechanical restraint was no longer required for any patient.

William A. F. Browne (1805–1885) introduced activities for patients including writing, art, group activity and drama, pioneered early forms of occupational therapy and art therapy, and initiated one of the earliest collections of artistic work by patients, at Montrose Asylum.

==== Rapid expansion ====
By the end of the 19th century, national systems of regulated asylums for the mentally ill had been established in most industrialized countries. At the turn of the century, Britain and France combined had only a few hundred people in asylums, but by the end of the century this number had risen to the hundreds of thousands. The United States housed 150,000 patients in mental hospitals by 1904. Germany housed more than 400 public and private sector asylums. These asylums were critical to the evolution of psychiatry as they provided places of practice throughout the world.

However, the hope that mental illness could be ameliorated through treatment during the mid-19th century was disappointed. Instead, psychiatrists were pressured by an ever-increasing patient population. The average number of patients in asylums in the United States jumped 927%. Numbers were similar in Britain and Germany. Overcrowding was rampant in France, where asylums would commonly take in double their maximum capacity. Increases in asylum populations may have been a result of the transfer of care from families and poorhouses, but the specific reasons as to why the increase occurred are still debated today. No matter the cause, the pressure on asylums from the increase was taking its toll on the asylums and psychiatry as a specialty. Asylums were once again turning into custodial institutions and the reputation of psychiatry in the medical world had hit an extreme low.

In the 1800s, middle class facilities became more common, replacing private care for wealthier persons. However, facilities in this period were largely oversubscribed. Individuals were referred to facilities either by the community or by the criminal justice system. Dangerous or violent cases were usually given precedence for admission. A survey taken in 1891 in Cape Town, South Africa shows the distribution between different facilities. Out of 2046 persons surveyed, 1,281 were in private dwellings, 120 in jails and 645 in asylums, with men representing nearly two-thirds of the number surveyed.

Defining someone as insane was a necessary prerequisite for being admitted to a facility. A doctor was only called after someone was labelled insane on social terms and had become socially or economically problematic. Until the 1890s, little distinction existed between the lunatic and criminal lunatic. The term was often used to police vagrancy as well as paupers and the insane. In the 1850s, lurid rumours that medical doctors were declaring normal people "insane" in Britain, were spread by the press causing widespread public anxiety. The fear was that people who were a source of embarrassment to their families were conveniently disposed of into asylums with the willing connivance of the psychiatric profession. This sensationalism appeared in widely read novels of the time, including The Woman in White.

=== 20th century ===
==== Physical therapies ====
A series of radical physical therapies were developed in central and continental Europe in the late 1910s, the 1920s and most particularly, the 1930s. Among these, we may note the Austrian psychiatrist Julius Wagner-Jauregg's malarial therapy for general paresis of the insane (or neurosyphilis) first used in 1917, and for which he won a Nobel Prize in 1927. This treatment heralded the beginning of a radical and experimental era in psychiatric medicine that increasingly broke with an asylum-based culture of therapeutic nihilism in the treatment of chronic psychiatric disorders, most particularly dementia praecox (increasingly known as schizophrenia from the 1910s, although the two terms were used more or less interchangeably until at least the end of the 1930s), which were typically regarded as hereditary degenerative disorders and therefore unamenable to any therapeutic intervention. Malarial therapy was followed in 1920 by barbiturate-induced deep sleep therapy to treat dementia praecox, which was popularised by the Swiss psychiatrist Jakob Klaesi. In 1933 the Vienna-based psychiatrist Manfred Sakel introduced insulin shock therapy, and in August 1934 Ladislas J. Meduna, a Hungarian neuropathologist and psychiatrist working in Budapest, introduced cardiazol shock therapy (cardiazol is the tradename of the chemical compound pentylenetetrazol, known by the tradename metrazol in the United States), which was the first convulsive or seizure therapy for a psychiatric disorder. Again, both of these therapies were initially targeted at curing dementia praecox. Cardiazol shock therapy, founded on the theoretical notion that there existed a biological antagonism between schizophrenia and epilepsy and that therefore inducing epileptiform fits in schizophrenic patients might effect a cure, was superseded by electroconvulsive therapy (ECT), invented by the Italian neurologist Ugo Cerletti in 1938.

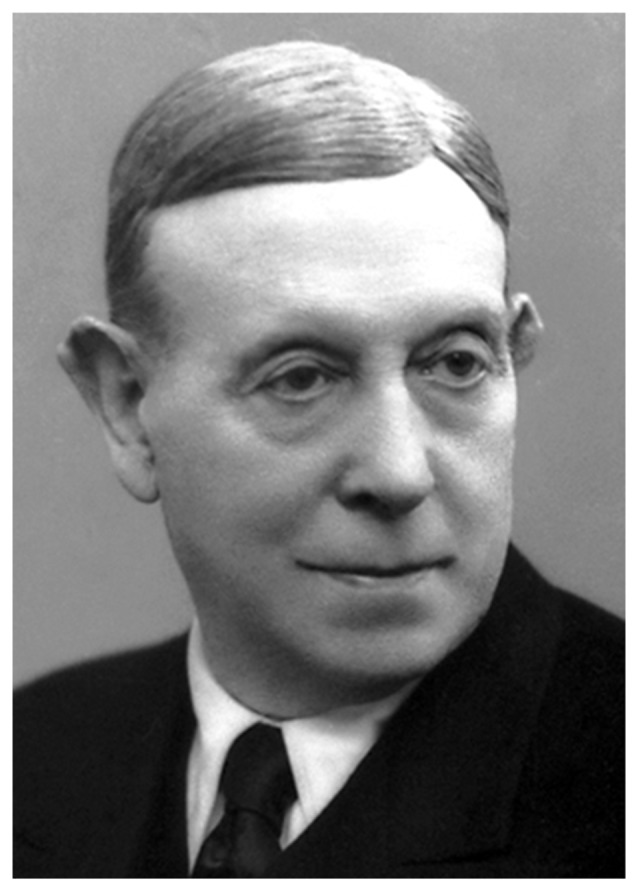
Egas Moniz pioneered the field of psychosurgery with the lobotomy of a patient's frontal lobes in 1935.

The use of psychosurgery was narrowed to a very small number of people for specific indications. Egas Moniz performed the first leucotomy, or lobotomy in Portugal in 1935, which targets the brain's frontal lobes. This was shortly thereafter adapted by Walter Freeman and James W. Watts in what is known as Freeman–Watts procedure or the standard prefrontal lobotomy. From 1946, Freeman developed the transorbital lobotomy, using a device akin to an ice-pick. This was an "office" procedure which did not have to be performed in a surgical theatre and took as little as fifteen minutes to complete. Freeman is credited with the popularisation of the technique in the United States. In 1949, 5,074 lobotomies were carried out in the United States and by 1951, 18,608 people had undergone the controversial procedure in that country. One of the most famous people to have a lobotomy was Rosemary Kennedy, who was rendered profoundly intellectually disabled as a result of the surgery.

In modern times, insulin shock therapy and lobotomies are viewed as being almost as barbaric as the Bedlam "treatments", although the insulin shock therapy was still seen as the only option which produced any noticeable effect on patients. ECT is still used in the West in the 21st century, but it is seen as a last resort for treatment of mood disorders and is administered much more safely than in the past. Elsewhere, particularly in India, use of ECT is reportedly increasing, as a cost-effective alternative to drug treatment. The effect of a shock on an overly excitable patient often allowed these patients to be discharged to their homes, which was seen by administrators (and often guardians) as a preferable solution to institutionalisation. Lobotomies were performed in the thousands from the 1930s to the 1950s, and were ultimately replaced with modern psychotropic drugs.

==== Eugenics movement ====
The eugenics movement of the early 20th century led to a number of countries enacting laws for the compulsory sterilization of the "feeble minded", which resulted in the forced sterilization of numerous psychiatric inmates. As late as the 1950s, laws in Japan allowed the forcible sterilization of patients with psychiatric illnesses.

Under Nazi Germany, the Aktion T4 euthanasia program resulted in the killings of thousands of the mentally ill housed in state institutions. In 1939, the Nazis secretly began to exterminate the mentally ill in a euthanasia campaign. Around 6,000 disabled babies, children and teenagers were murdered by starvation or lethal injection.

==== Psychiatric internment as a political device ====
Psychiatrists around the world have been involved in the suppression of individual rights by states wherein the definitions of mental disease had been expanded to include political disobedience. Nowadays, in many countries, political prisoners are sometimes confined to mental institutions and abused therein. Psychiatry possesses a built-in capacity for abuse which is greater than in other areas of medicine. The diagnosis of mental disease can serve as proxy for the designation of social dissidents, allowing the state to hold persons against their will and to insist upon therapies that work in favour of ideological conformity and in the broader interests of society.

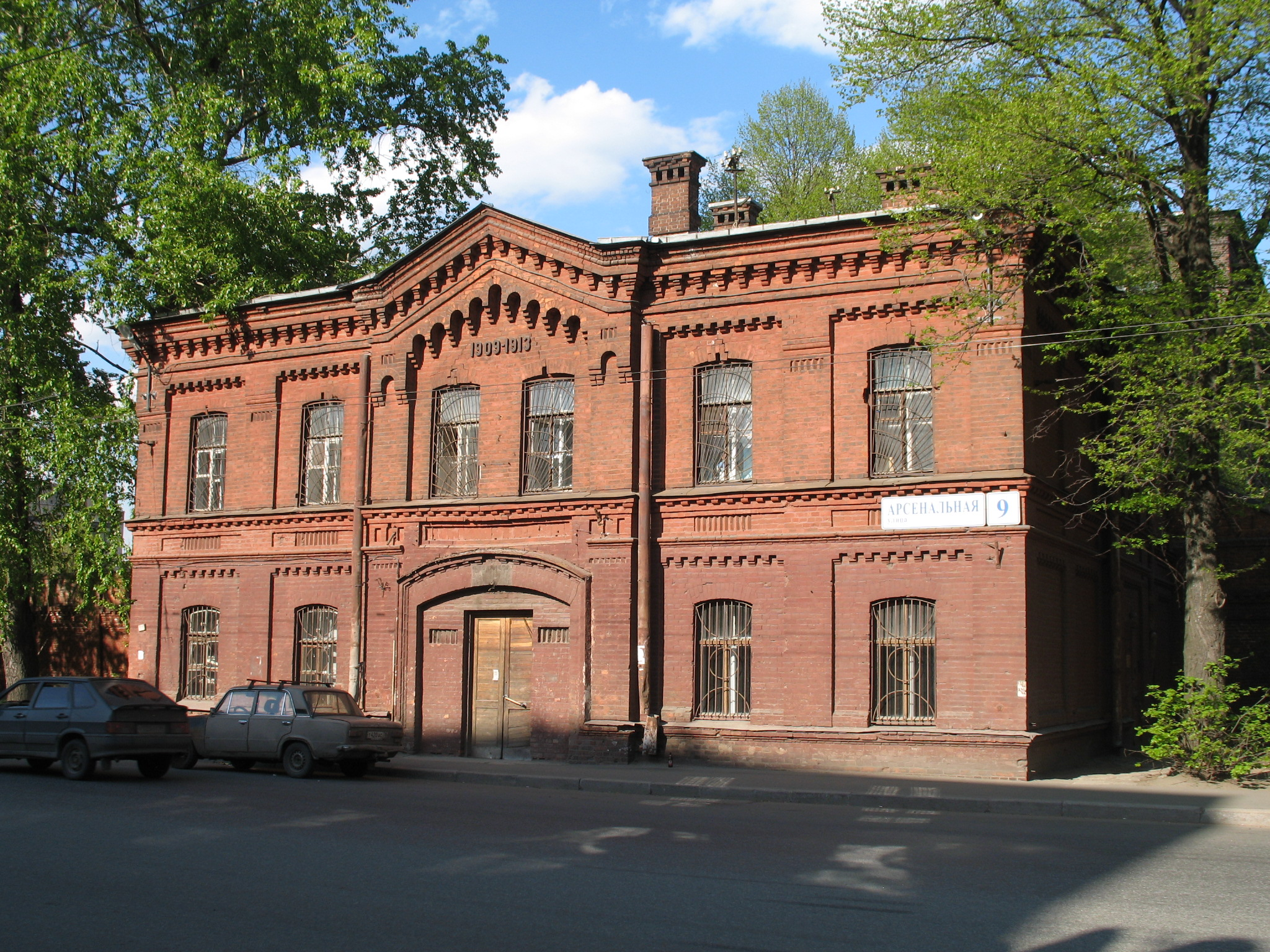
Leningrad Special Psychiatric Hospital of Prison Type of the USSR Ministry of Internal Affairs was a psychiatric institution used by the Soviet authorities to suppress dissent.

In a monolithic state, psychiatry can be used to bypass standard legal procedures for establishing guilt or innocence and allow political incarceration without the ordinary odium attaching to such political trials. In Nazi Germany in the 1940s, the 'duty to care' was violated on an enormous scale: A reported 300,000 individuals were sterilised and 100,000 killed in Germany alone, as were many thousands further afield, mainly in Eastern Europe.

From the 1960s up to 1986, political abuse of psychiatry was reported to be systematic in the Soviet Union, and to surface on occasion in other Eastern European countries such as Romania, Hungary, Czechoslovakia and Yugoslavia. A "mental health genocide" reminiscent of the Nazi aberrations has been located in the history of South African oppression during the apartheid era. A continued misappropriation of the discipline was subsequently attributed to the People's Republic of China.

==== Drugs ====
The 20th century saw the development of the first effective psychiatric drugs.

The first anti-psychotic drug, chlorpromazine (known under the trade name Largactil in Europe and Thorazine in the United States), was first synthesized in France in 1950. Pierre Deniker, a psychiatrist of the Saint-Anne Psychiatric Center in Paris, is credited with first recognising the specificity of action of the drug in psychosis in 1952. Deniker traveled with a colleague to the United States and Canada promoting the drug at medical conferences in 1954. The first publication regarding its use in North America was made in the same year by the Canadian psychiatrist Heinz Lehmann, who was based in Montreal. Also in 1954 another antipsychotic, reserpine, was first used by an American psychiatrist based in New York, Nathan S. Kline. At a Paris-based colloquium on neuroleptics (antipsychotics) in 1955 a series of psychiatric studies were presented by, among others, Hans Hoff (Vienna), Dr. Ihsan Aksel (Istanbul), Felix Labarth (Basle), Linford Rees (London), Sarro (Barcelona), Manfred Bleuler (Zurich), Willi Mayer-Gross (Birmingham), Winford (Washington) and Denber (New York) attesting to the effective and concordant action of the new drugs in the treatment of psychosis.

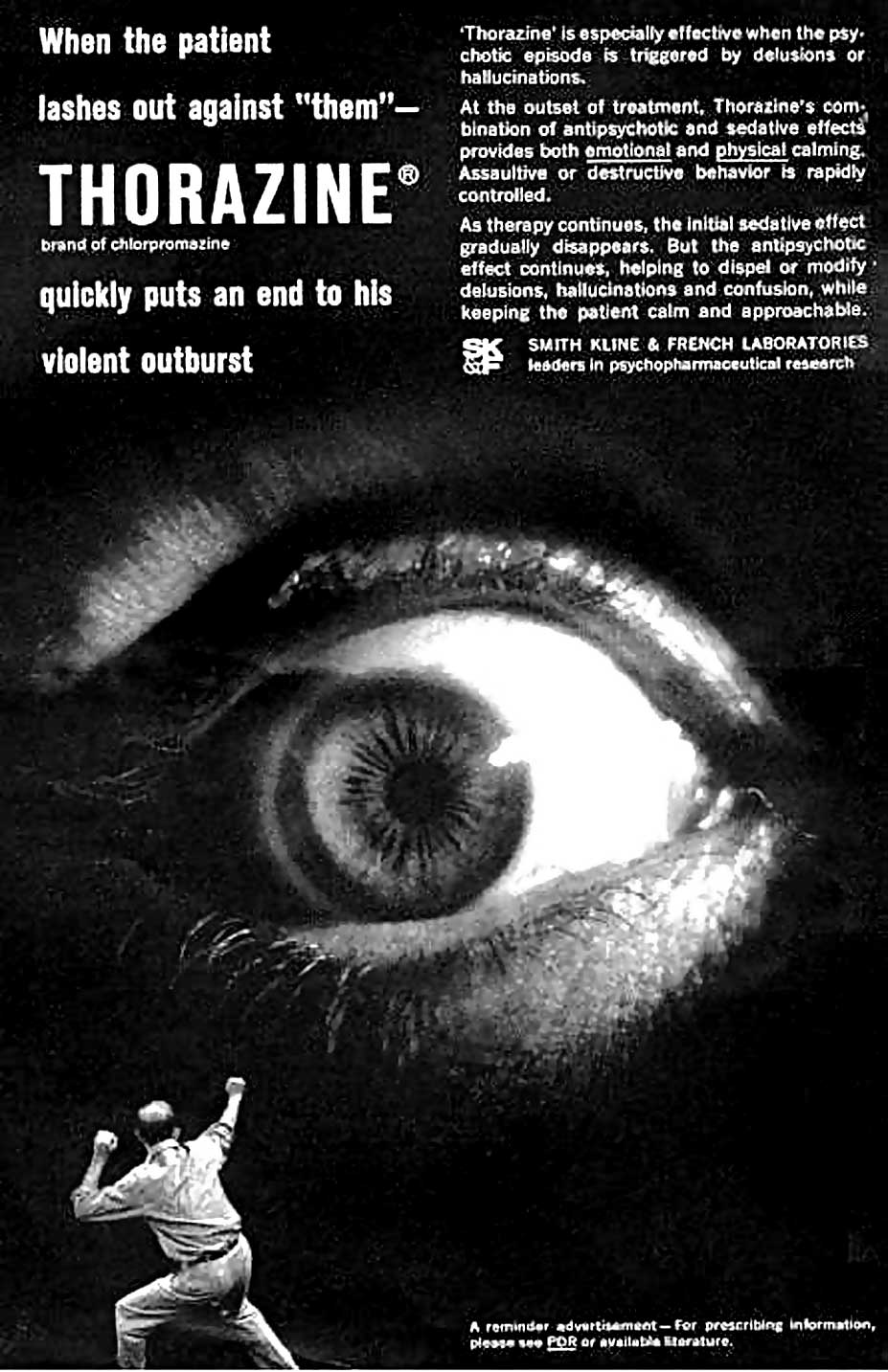
Advertisement for Thorazine (chlorpromazine) from the early 1960s

The new antipsychotics had an immense impact on the lives of psychiatrists and patients. For instance, Henri Ey, a French psychiatrist at Bonneval, related that between 1921 and 1937 only 6% of patients with schizophrenia and chronic delirium were discharged from his institution. The comparable figure for the period from 1955 to 1967, after the introduction of chlorpromazine, was 67%. Between 1955 and 1968 the residential psychiatric population in the United States dropped by 30%. Newly developed antidepressants were used to treat cases of depression, and the introduction of muscle relaxants allowed ECT to be used in a modified form for the treatment of severe depression and a few other disorders.

The discovery of the mood stabilizing effect of lithium carbonate by John Cade in 1948 would eventually revolutionise the treatment of bipolar disorder, although its use was banned in the United States until the 1970s.

==== United States: reform in the 1940s ====
From 1942 to 1947, conscientious objectors in the US assigned to psychiatric hospitals under Civilian Public Service exposed abuses throughout the psychiatric care system and were instrumental in reforms of the 1940s and 1950s. The CPS reformers were especially active at the Philadelphia State Hospital where four Quakers initiated The Attendant magazine as a way to communicate ideas and promote reform. This periodical later became The Psychiatric Aide, a professional journal for mental health workers. On 6 May 1946, Life magazine printed an exposé of the psychiatric system by Albert Q. Maisel based on the reports of COs. Another effort of CPS, namely the Mental Hygiene Project, became the national Mental Health Foundation. Initially skeptical about the value of Civilian Public Service, Eleanor Roosevelt, impressed by the changes introduced by COs in the mental health system, became a sponsor of the National Mental Health Foundation and actively inspired other prominent citizens including Owen J. Roberts, Pearl Buck and Harry Emerson Fosdick to join her in advancing the organization's objectives of reform and humane treatment of patients.

==== Deinstitutionalisation ====
By the beginning of the 20th century, ever-increasing admissions had resulted in serious overcrowding. Funding was often cut, especially during periods of economic decline, and during wartime in particular many patients starved to death. Asylums became notorious for poor living conditions, lack of hygiene, overcrowding, and ill-treatment and abuse of patients.

The first community-based alternatives were suggested and tentatively implemented in the 1920s and 1930s, although asylum numbers continued to increase up to the 1950s. The movement for deinstitutionalisation came to the fore in various Western countries in the 1950s and 1960s.

The prevailing public arguments, time of onset, and pace of reforms varied by country. Class action lawsuits in the United States, and the scrutiny of institutions through disability activism and antipsychiatry, helped expose the poor conditions and treatment. Sociologists and others argued that such institutions maintained or created dependency, passivity, exclusion and disability, causing people to be institutionalised.

There was an argument that community services would be cheaper. It was suggested that new psychiatric medications made it more feasible to release people into the community.

There were differing views on deinstitutionalization, however, in groups such as mental health professionals, public officials, families, advocacy groups, public citizens and unions.

== Today ==
=== Africa ===
- Uganda had one psychiatric hospital as of 2007.
- South Africa had 27 registered psychiatric hospitals as of 2018. These hospitals are spread throughout the country. Some of the most well-known institutions are: Weskoppies Psychiatric Hospital, colloquially known as Groendakkies ("Little Green Roofs") and Denmar Psychiatric Hospital in Pretoria, TARA in Johannesburg, and Valkenberg Hospital in Cape Town.

=== Asia ===
In Japan, the number of hospital beds has risen steadily over the last few decades.

In Hong Kong, a number of residential care services such as half-way houses, long-stay care homes, and supported hostels are provided for the discharged patients. In addition, a number of community support services such as Community Rehabilitation Day Services, Community Mental Health Link, Community Mental Health Care, etc. have been launched to facilitate the re-integration of patients into the community.

=== Europe ===
Countries where deinstitutionalisation has happened may be experiencing a process of "re-institutionalisation" or relocation to different institutions, as evidenced by increases in the number of supported housing facilities, forensic psychiatric beds and rising numbers in the prison population.

=== New Zealand ===
New Zealand established a reconciliation initiative in 2005 in the context of ongoing compensation payouts to ex-patients of state-run mental institutions in the 1970s to 1990s. The forum heard of poor reasons for admissions; unsanitary and overcrowded conditions; lack of communication to patients and family members; physical violence and sexual misconduct and abuse; inadequate complaints mechanisms; pressures and difficulties for staff, within an authoritarian psychiatric hierarchy based on containment; fear and humiliation in the misuse of seclusion; over-use and abuse of ECT, psychiatric medication and other treatments/punishments, including group therapy, with continued adverse effects; lack of support on discharge; interrupted lives and lost potential; and continued stigma, prejudice and emotional distress and trauma.

There were some references to instances of helpful aspects or kindnesses despite the system. Participants were offered counselling to help them deal with their experiences, and advice on their rights, including access to records and legal redress.

=== South America ===
In several South American countries, the total number of beds in asylum-type institutions has decreased, replaced by psychiatric inpatient units in general hospitals and other local settings.

=== United Kingdom ===
At the beginning of the 19th century, there were, perhaps, a few thousand "lunatics" housed in a variety of disparate institutions; but, by the beginning of the 20th century, that figure had grown to about 100,000. This growth coincided with the development of "alienism," now known as psychiatry, as a medical specialty.

=== United States ===
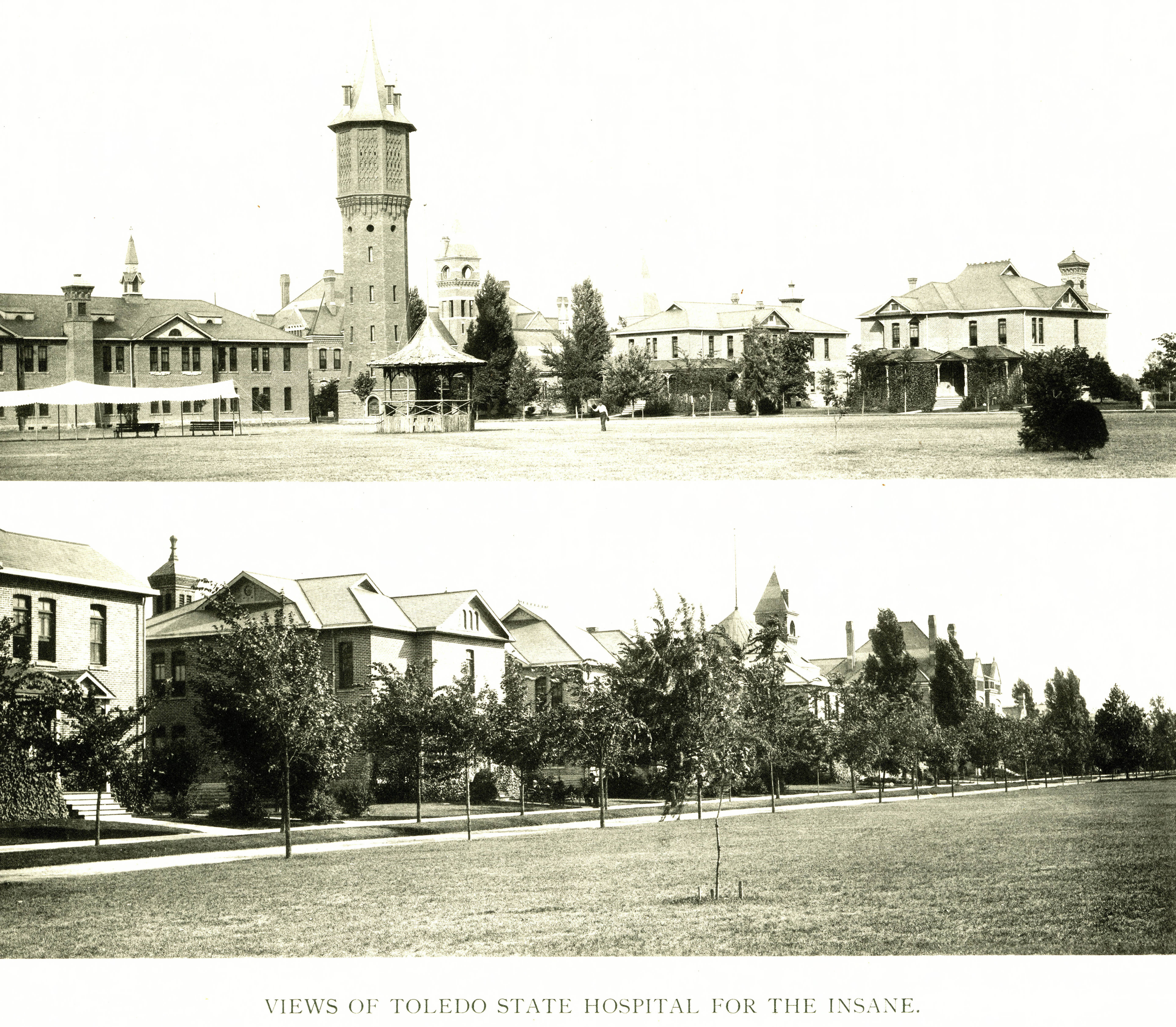
Views of Toledo State Hospital for the Insane

The United States has experienced two waves of deinstitutionalization. Wave one began in the 1950s and targeted people with mental illness. The second wave began roughly fifteen years after and focused on individuals who had been diagnosed with a developmental disability (e.g. intellectual disability).

A process of indirect cost-shifting may have led to a form of "re-institutionalization" through the increased use of jail detention for those with mental disorders deemed unmanageable and noncompliant. In summer 2009, author and columnist Heather Mac Donald stated in City Journal, "jails have become society's primary mental institutions, though few have the funding or expertise to carry out that role properly... at Rikers, 28% of the inmates require mental health services, a number that rises each year."

== See also ==
- Deinstitutionalization
- History of mental disorders
- Kirkbride Plan
- Timeline of psychiatry
- Clifford W. Beers
- History of psychiatric institutions in China
- List of asylums commissioned in England and Wales
- Ann Pratt
