= Frederick Pratt =

Frederick Pratt may refer to:

- Frederick Pratt (minister) (1870–1932), Australian Congregational church minister
- Frederick Haven Pratt (1873–1958), American physiologist
- Frederick L. Pratt (1928–2021), American politician, a member of the New Hampshire House of Representatives

== See also ==
- Frederic B. Pratt (1865–1945), American heir
