= Thomas Pratt =

Thomas Pratt may refer to:

- Tame Parata (1837–1917), Māori Member of Parliament in New Zealand, also known under his European name Thomas Pratt
- Thomas Pratt (artist), also known as "Kneon", American comic-book artist
- Thomas Pratt (Maryland politician) (1804–1869), American lawyer and politician; governor of Maryland, 1845–1848 and U.S. Senator, 1850–1857
- Thomas Pratt (film editor) (1898–1973), American film editor
- Thomas Simson Pratt (1797–1879), British Army general
- Thomas Willis Pratt (1812–1875), American engineer
- Tom Pratt (baseball) (1844–1908), professional baseball player for the Philadelphia Athletics
- Tom Pratt (American football) (born 1935), American football coach
- Tom Pratt (footballer, born 1873) (1873–1935), English footballer
- Tom Pratt (footballer, born 1995), English footballer
- Tommy Pratt (1905–1992), Australian footballer
