= Michael Pratt =

Michael or Mike Pratt may refer to:

- Mike Pratt (actor) (1931–1976), British actor and songwriter
- Lord Michael Pratt (1946–2007), British author
- Mike Pratt (basketball) (1948–2022), American basketball player, coach, and broadcaster
- Mike Pratt (politician) (born 1948), Australian politician, member of the Australian House of Representatives for Adelaide
- Michael Pratt (GC) (1954–2025), Australian police officer and recipient of the George Cross
- Mike Pratt (businessman), Canadian businessman, president of Best Buy Canada
- Michael Pratt, owner of the defunct pornographic website GirlsDoPorn
- Michael Pratt (American football) (born 2001), American football player
