= William Pratt =

William or Billy Pratt may refer to:

- William B. Pratt (1935–2019), American physician and politician
- William Pratt (MP for Southwark), English politician
- William Henry Pratt, real name of actor Boris Karloff
- William Pratt (born 1609), ancestor of the Pratt-Romney family
- Billy Pratt (rugby league) (1932–2009), English rugby league footballer of the 1950s for Leeds, and Halifax
- William V. Pratt (1869–1957), admiral in the United States Navy
  - USS William V. Pratt, a Farragut-class destroyer in the service of the United States Navy
- William W. Pratt (c. 1821 – 1864), American playwright and actor
- William Pratt (priest) (1732–1770), Anglican priest in Ireland
- William Pratt (cricketer) (1895–1974), English cricketer
- William Dymock Pratt (1854–1916), English architect
- William Pratt (businessman) (1928–1999), Canadian businessman
- Billy Pratt (footballer, born 1872) (1872–?), English football winger for Small Heath from 1889 to 1892
- Billy Pratt (footballer, born 1874) (1874–?), English football full-back for Small Heath from 1894 to 1902
- Spike (Buffy the Vampire Slayer), a character from television series Buffy the Vampire Slayer
