= George Pratt =

George Pratt may refer to:

== Arts and sciences ==
- George Pratt (artist) (born 1960), American painter and graphic novelist
- George Pratt (missionary) (1817–1894), author of the first Samoan language grammar and dictionary
- George Dupont Pratt (1869–1935), environmentalist
- George Pratt (1935–2017), musical academic (Keele, Huddersfield), member of The Master Singers

== Politics and law ==
- George Pratt, 2nd Marquess Camden (1799–1866), British peer and Tory politician
- George W. Pratt (1830–1862), New York state senator, and Union Army colonel
- George Pratt (Connecticut politician) (1832–1875), American lawyer and politician
- George White Pratt (1840–1899), Wisconsin state senator and assemblyman
- George C. Pratt (1928–2025), U.S. federal appellate judge
- George C. Pratt (Wisconsin pioneer) (1811–1895), Wisconsin state senator

== Sportspeople ==
- George Pratt (footballer) (born 2003), English footballer

== Characters ==
- George Pratt, a character in Philip Van Doren Stern's short story The Greatest Gift
- George Pratt, a character in the Johnny Horton song North to Alaska
