= David Pratt =

David Pratt may refer to:

- David Pratt (footballer) (1896–1967), Scottish football player and manager
- David Pratt (failed assassin) (1908–1961), failed assassin of South African Prime Minister Hendrik Verwoerd
- David Foster Pratt (1918–2010), American artist, art instructor and designer
- David Wixon Pratt, spectroscopist
- David Pratt (cricketer) (born 1938), English cricketer
- David Pratt (politician) (born 1955), Canadian politician
- David Pratt (author) (born 1957), American author
- David Pratt (Canadian broadcaster), Canadian sports radio personality and columnist
- David Pratt (Scottish journalist)
- David C. Pratt, American businessman
