= John Pratt =

John Pratt may refer to:

- John Pratt (judge) (1657–1725), Lord Chief Justice of England and interim Chancellor of the Exchequer
- John Pratt (soldier) (1753–1824), United States Army officer
- John Pratt, 1st Marquess Camden (1759–1840), British politician
- John Pratt, 3rd Marquess Camden (1840–1872), British politician
- John Pratt, 4th Marquess Camden (1872–1943), British peer
- John Pratt (died 1835), hanged for sodomy
- John Pratt (archdeacon of Calcutta) (1809–1871), British clergyman and mathematician, developer of the theory of isostasy
- John Pratt (cricketer) (1834–1886), English cricketer
- John Teele Pratt (1873–1927), American corporate attorney, philanthropist, music impresario, and financier
- John Pratt (Liberal politician) (1873–1952), Scottish Liberal politician
- John Lee Pratt (1879–1975), American businessman who served on GM's board of directors
- John Pratt (Canadian politician) (1894–1973), Manitoban politician
- John H. Pratt (1910–1995), US Court of Appeals judge
- John Pratt (Provost of Southwell) (1913–1992), Anglican archdeacon and provost
- John Winton or John Pratt (1931–2001), English naval officer, author and obituarist
- John W. Pratt (born 1931), professor of statistics, economics, and business at Harvard University
- John Pratt (footballer) (born 1948), English footballer
- John Bridge Pratt (1833–1870), husband of Anna Bronson Alcott Pratt, the elder sister of novelist Louisa May Alcott
- John G. Pratt (1816–1866), Confederate general from Louisiana
- John M. Pratt (1886–1954), tax resistance leader, activist, publicist and newspaper man
- John S. Pratt (1931–2020), American Army drum instructor
- John Pratt (inventor) (1831–1905), American journalist and newspaper editor
- John Pratt (archdeacon of St Davids), Welsh Anglican priest

== See also ==
- John Pratt-Johnson (1929–2015), Canadian ophthalmologist
- Robert John Pratt (1907–2003), Canadian architect, comedian, and politician
- John Christopher Pratt (1935–2022), Canadian artist
- Jack Pratt (1878–1938), American film director
- Jack Pratt (ice hockey) (1906–1988), Scottish hockey player
- John Prats, Filipino director, model, entrepreneur and actor
