= Johann Jakob Guggenbühl =

Swiss physician

Johann Jakob Guggenbühl (August 13, 1816, Meilen – February 2, 1863 Montreux) was a Swiss physician. He is considered as one of the precursors of medico-educational care.

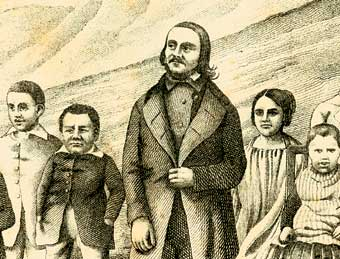
Johann Jakob Guggenbühl with children of his hospital, 1853.

== Life ==
Guggenbühl showed interest in cretinism and was convinced that this disease could be cured. He created, in 1841, a residential home for mentally-handicapped children in Interlaken that lasted until 1860.

== Works ==
- Hülfsruf aus den Alpen, zur Bekämpfung des schrecklichen Cretinismus. In: Maltens Bibliothek der neuesten Weltkunde. Band 1, Aarau 1840, p. 191 et seq.
- Briefe über den Abendberg und die Heilanstalt für Cretinismus, 1846.
- Die Heilung und Verhütung des Cretinismus und ihre neuesten Fortschritte, 1853.

== See also ==
- History of psychiatric institutions
