= Richard Pratt =

Richard Pratt may refer to:

- Richard Prat, Mayor of Canterbury, 1456–1457
- Richard Pratt (Ripon MP) (fl. 1563), English Member of Parliament
- Richard Henry Pratt (1840–1924), American general, founder of the Carlisle Indian Industrial School
- Richard Pratt (cricketer) (1896–1982), English cricketer for Derbyshire
- Richard Pratt (businessman) (1934–2009), Australian businessman
- Richie Pratt (1943–2015), American musician
- Richard L. Pratt Jr. (born 1953), American theologian
- Richard Pratt (priest) (born 1955), Church of England priest

== See also ==
- Pratt (surname)
