= Jessica Pratt =

Jessica Pratt may refer to:

- Jessica Pratt (singer-songwriter) (born 1987), American folk singer-songwriter
  - Jessica Pratt (album), Pratt's 2012 self-titled debut album
- Jessica Pratt (soprano) (born 1979), Australian operatic soprano
- Jess Pratt (born 1997), Australian cyclist

Jessica Pratt featured in songs by ASAP Rocky.
