= Pratz =

Pratz may refer to:

== Places ==
- Pratz, Luxembourg, a town in Luxembourg
- Pratz, Jura, a commune in the department of Jura in France

== People with the surname ==
- Albert Pratz (1914–1995), Canadian classical violinist, conductor, composer and music educator
