= Thane K. Pratt =

American wildlife biologist (born 1950)

Thane Kastle Pratt (born 1950) is an American wildlife biologist. Pratt was raised in Hawaii, and his research has focused on the birds of Hawaii and other Pacific islands. He led a career with the U.S. Geological Survey (USGS) until his 2009 retirement, and is the author of multiple books on the birds of Hawaii and New Guinea. Pratt also serves as the regional editor for Hawaii and the Pacific islands in the Christmas Bird Count. A subspecies of Crateroscelis robusta, C. r. pratti, is named in his honor.

Pratt was born in Honolulu in 1950, a son of John Scott Boyd Pratt III and Brenda (née Cooke) Pratt. He attended Hawaii Preparatory Academy, from which he graduated in 1969. During high school, he partook in birding; pages of his field notes dated 1967 are held in the University of Hawaiʻi at Hilo research library. Pratt holds a B.A. degree in biology and ecology from Colby College, as well as a Ph.D. in ecology from Rutgers University–New Brunswick.

In 1986, the first edition of Birds of New Guinea by Bruce M. Beehler, Pratt, and Dale A. Zimmerman was published by Princeton University Press. Described in an Australian Bird Watcher review as "a definitive field guide to the birds of New Guinea", the book contained text contributions and illustrations from multiple contributors. Another review, published in The Canadian Field-Naturalist, described the book as a "worthwhile addition", but mentioned the lack of range maps.

Beginning in 1989, Pratt was a wildlife biologist based at the U.S. Geological Survey's Pacific Island Ecosystems Research Center in Hawaiʻi Volcanoes National Park. As a researcher, his studies included bird population assessments of various Hawaiian islands. In 2009, the same year he retired from the USGS, Conservation Biology of Hawaiian Forest Birds, an edited book by Pratt and coeditors, was published by Yale University Press. The book, considered the culmination of his USGS research projects, was described as "excellent" in a review published by The Auk, and received an additional positive review in The Condor. The latter review noted the book's "depressing" tone and urged politicians to further support the research described in the volume.

Two new editions of Birds of New Guinea (a second and revised edition), now edited by Pratt and Beehler, were published by Princeton University Press between 2014 and 2016. Reviews for the edition were published in The Canadian Field-Naturalist, Ibis, and the Journal of Field Ornithology.
