= John Pratt (archdeacon of St Davids) =

John Pratt was a Welsh Anglican priest in the second half of the 16th century.

Pratt was educated at Brasenose College, Oxford. He was Archdeacon of St Davids from 1557 to 1581.
