= Mike Pratt (businessman) =

Chief executive officer if Guitar Center Inc.

Mike Pratt was the Chief Executive Officer of Guitar Center Inc. in 2013–14. He replaced Kevin Layden and managed both the Future Shop and Best Buy brands. He joined Best Buy Canada in 1990 as a Future Shop sales representative upon graduation from the University of Ontario. Mike Pratt held variety of senior positions within his first 15 years with the company, from General Manager at Future Shop and up to and including Senior Vice President Best Buy Division.

In 2008, Best Buy Co. Inc. named Mike Pratt President and Chief Operating Officer for Best Buy Canada Ltd.

In April 2013, Mike Pratt was named CEO of Guitar Center Inc. In November 2014, he was replaced by Darrell Webb, President & CEO.

The leadership transition was accompanied by disappointing financial results at Guitar Center. According to several sources, the retailer's EBITDA (earnings before interest, taxes, depreciation, and amortization) declined to $18 million in the third quarter from $28 million for the same period a year ago. Quarterly revenues advanced 1.5% for the period to $528 million compared to $520 million a year ago. However, same-store sales for the period dropped 1.7%.
