= Margarethe Krupp =

German businesswoman (1854–1931)

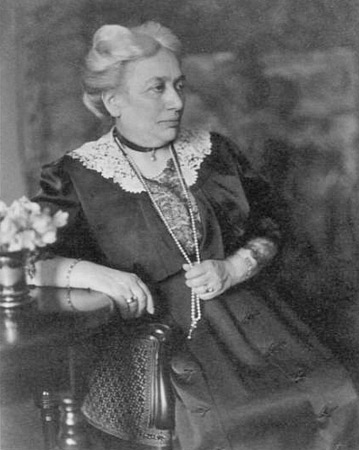

Margarethe Krupp (15 March 1854 – 24 February 1931; née Margarethe von Ende) was a German businesswoman.

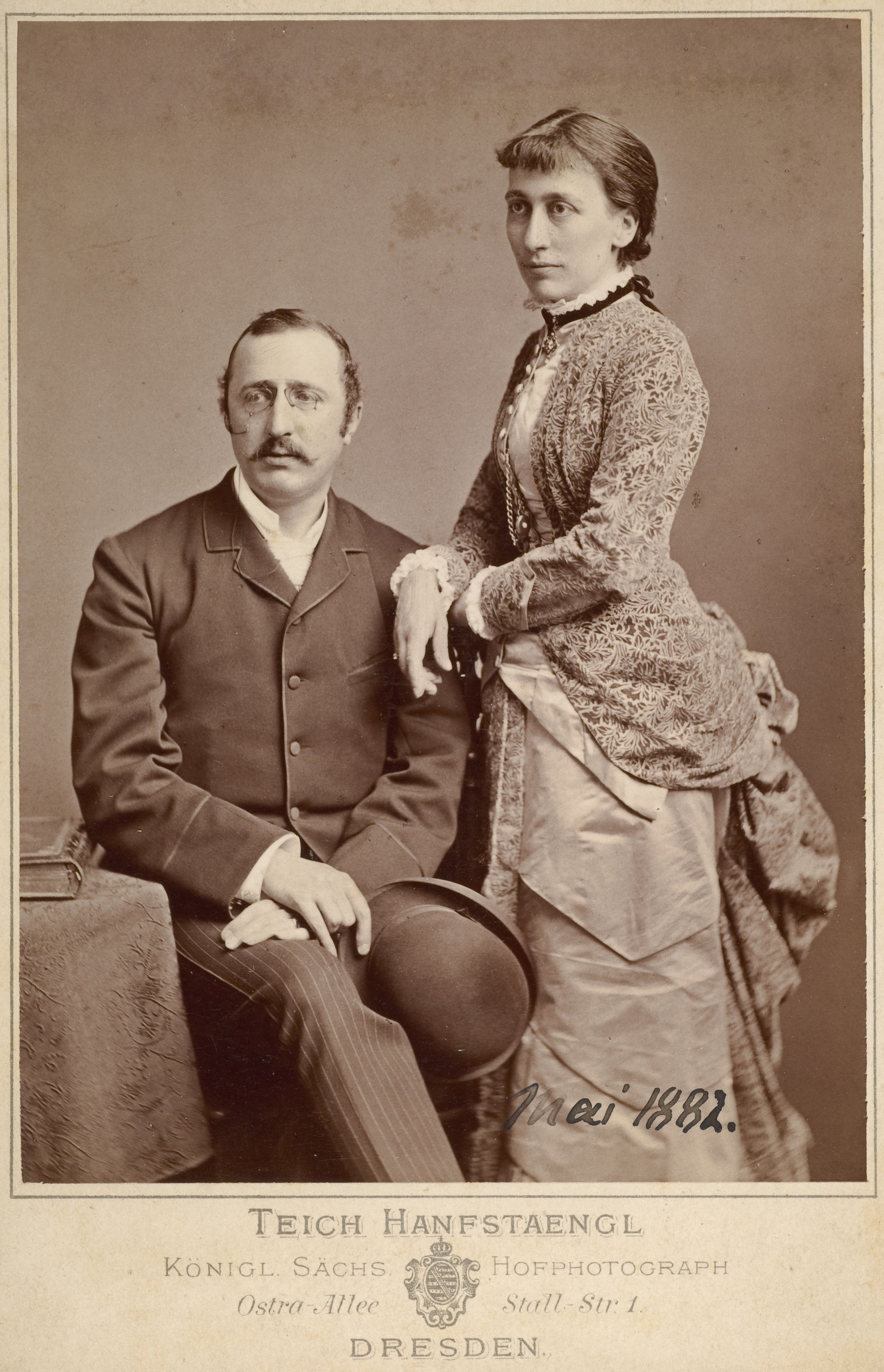
Alfred and Margarethe Krupp in 1882

She was the wife of Friedrich Alfred Krupp (1854–1902) and mother of Bertha Krupp (1886–1957).

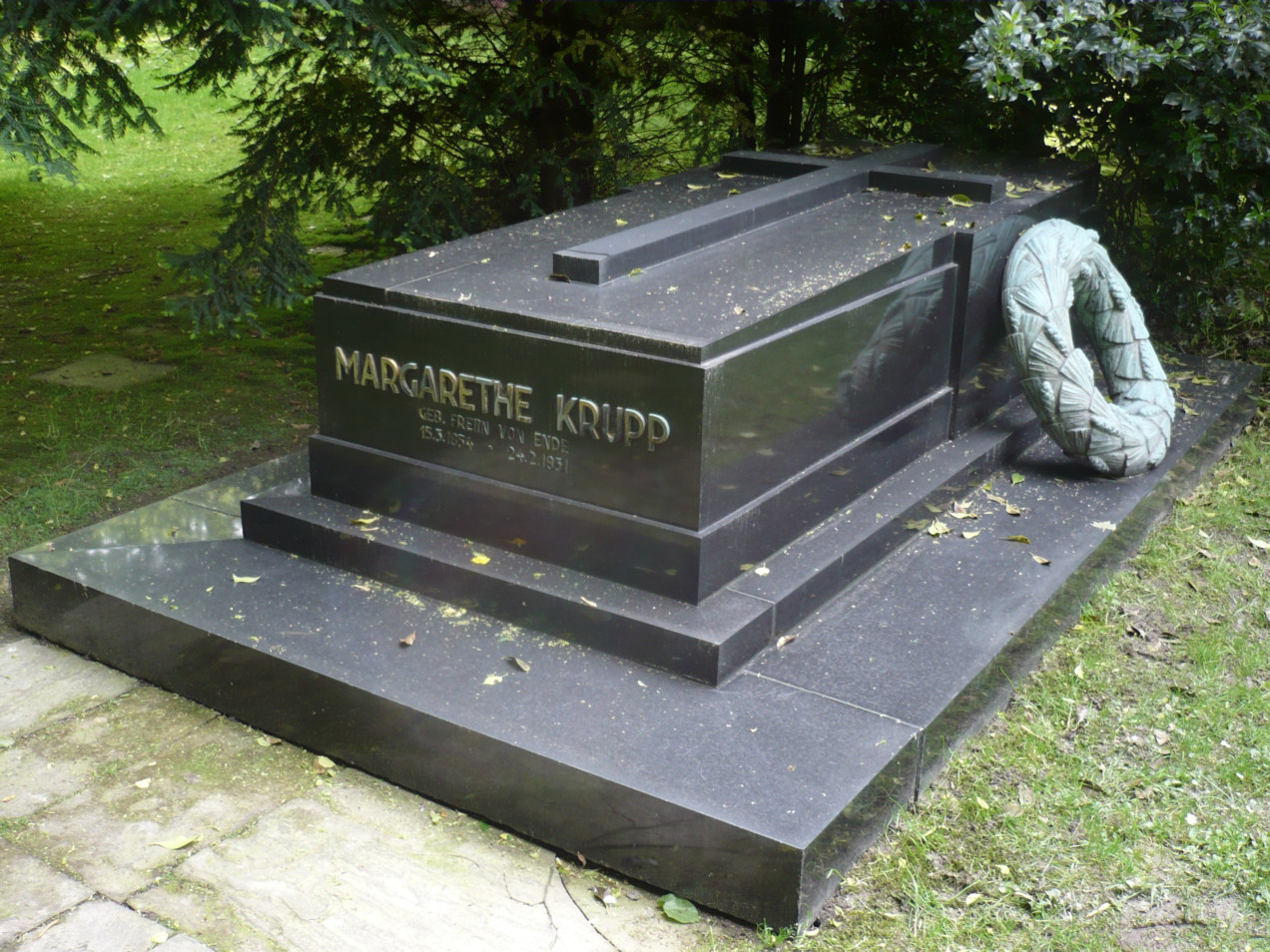
Krupp's grave in the Friedhof Bredeney in Essen

== Personal life ==
Margarethe von Ende was born in Wrocław (Breslau) on 15 March 1854. She was the eldest daughter of Freiherr August von Ende (1815–1899) and Eleonore Gräfin von Königsdorff (1831–1907), and the fourth of their ten children. She had two years of secondary education and then, against her mother's wishes, studied teaching and worked as a governess, in England and later in Dessau at the court of the Duchy of Anhalt. In 1872 she met Friedrich Alfred Krupp in Essen. They married in 1882, although his family was at first against him marrying an aristocrat. They had two daughters, Bertha (1886–1957) and Barbara (1887–1972).

On 8 August 1912 she was named " Ehrenbürgerin" ("honorary citizen") of the town of Essen, the first woman to be so honoured.

Margarethe Krupp died on 24 February 1931 and is buried in the Bredeney cemetery in Essen.

== Business ==
When her husband died in 1902, her daughter Bertha inherited the Krupp company. As she was a minor, Margarethe became the head of the company's trustees until Bertha's marriage in 1906.

== Housing ==
The Krupp company had provided accommodation for its employees since the 1870s, but Margarethe created an innovative housing scheme influenced by the garden city movement. In contrast to other Krupp housing provision, this estate provided housing for a mixture of classes of employees and local government officials. She had acquired land in the south west of Essen and in 1906, after her daughter's marriage, she donated an area of land and one million marks to establish the Margarethe Krupp Foundation (Die Margarethe Krupp-Stiftung), which is still a major housing provider in Essen. The area where the homes were built was named Margarethenhöhe by the Essen council in her honour. As of 2025 the foundation manages 3,100 residential units and 60 commercial units.

== Legacy ==
In the German television series Krupp – Eine deutsche Familie the part of Margarethe Krupp was played by Barbara Auer.

A novel based on her story was published in 2023 by Birgit Ebbert, titled Die Königin von der Ruhr: Margarethe Krupp und die Gründung der Margarethenhöhe [The queen of the Ruhr: Margarethe Krupp and the founding of the Margarethenhöhe] (Lübbe, ISBN 978-3757700089)
