= George Pratt (Connecticut politician) =

American politician

George Pratt (October 12, 1832 – June 4, 1875) was an American lawyer and politician.

Pratt was born in East Weymouth, Mass., Oct. 12, 1832. He graduated from Yale College in 1857. After graduation, he taught for a year in Blooming Grove, N.Y., pursuing legal studies at the same time, and then entered the law office of Hon. John T. Wait, in Norwich Town, Conn., and was admitted to the bar in April, 1859. While studying with Wait, his residence was in Salem, Conn, where he had married, July 31, 1858, Miss Sarah V., daughter of Hon Oramel Whittlesey. He was elected to represent the town in the Connecticut General Assembly in 1860, and in the same year removed to Norwich, where he opened a law office, and resided in the practice of his profession until his death In 1864, '65, and '69, he represented Norwich in the General Assembly, and in that capacity was the author of several important measures. Meantime he rose steadily in his profession, and in the city where he was best known was more extensively employed and trusted than any practitioner of his years. He was for some years City Attorney, and was Yale Corporation Counsel at the time of his death.

On a visit to Hartford in the middle of May last, he contracted a cold which developed into typhoid pneumonia, subsequently followed by paralysis and cerebro-spinal meningitis, which ended, after a painful struggle, in his death at Norwich, June 4, 1875. His widow survived him, with children.
