= David Pratt (author) =

American writer (born 1957)

- Born: 11 December 1957 (age 68); Hartford, Connecticut, U.S.
- Occupation: Writer
- Writing career
- Period: 1992–present
- Genres: Young adult, Gay literature
- Notable work: Bob the Book
- Website: hostapress.com

David Pratt (born 11 December 1957 in Hartford, CT) is an American writer who mainly writes Gay literature fiction, with a focus on short stories and novels. He also has directed and performed his own work for theater, and helped found Hosta Press.

== Life and career ==
=== Early life ===
Pratt graduated from Hamilton College in 1980 with a B.A. in English and Theatre. After graduation, he lived in [New York City] for several years and worked different part-time jobs while writing, and also worked in communications and development for Lincoln Center Institute for the Arts in Education and for the Carnegie Council for Ethics in International Affairs. He began publishing short fiction in 1992 in such publications as Christopher Street, The James White Review, Blithe House Quarterly, and Velvet Mafia. These stories were later collected in My Movie (Chelsea Station Editions, 2012. In 1999 he attended The New School and graduated in 2001 with a Master of fine arts, with a specialization in Creative Writing. During his time at The New School, he ran the 101 Stories in 101 Days club, where most of his published material was conceived.

=== Career ===
Pratt's first novel was Bob the Book (2010), which was awarded the Lambda Literary Award for Gay Debut Fiction in 2011, as well as being nominated for the 2011 TLA GAYBIE Best Fiction award. He released a series of questionnaires on the publisher's website in order to help both young adults and adults make sense of the book.

Shortly after, in 2012, Pratt released My Movie, a collection of short stories that he had published in the periodicals listed above and in anthologies like Men Seeking Men and Fresh Men 2. Most of the stories in the book deal with Pratt's own childhood heartbreak, feeling alone, dysfunctional relationships, and problems of sexual addiction; in an interview for LGBTQ Nation, Pratt even describes it as his "virtual autobiography from about age eight to age 35".

Pratt released two novels in 2017. The first, Wallaçonia, was released on 25 March and it was his first young adult novel, specifically his first Bildungsroman, which dealt with issues that men with homosexual desires might experience. In June he released Looking after Joey On 7 June 2017, Pratt released Looking After Joey, a speculative and satirical novel that was based on "Calvin gets sucked In" from his collection My Movie. Pratt uses the idea of a porn character stepping out of the television to "make fun of all things gay and all things Manhattan", as he puts it in his personal blog.

On 2 April 2019, Pratt released Todd Sweeney: The Fiend of Fleet High, a contemporary parody of the Victorian era Sweeney Todd that mixes elements of thriller and gay fiction. This was also Hosta Press' first published book. He has also had some recent anthology publications, including Jameson Currier's With, Paul Alan Fahey's The Other Man, and Jerry Wheeler's The Dirty Diner.

=== Theatre ===
Pratt directed and performed several of his works for the theatre during time in New York City, including the HERE Arts Center, The Flea Theatre, the Theatre of the Elephant, The Duplex, the Cornelia Street Café, Dixon Place, and the Eight Annual New York International Fringe Festival. He also was the original director for various plays by John Mighton, the Canadian playwright, and has collaborated with various others, such as Brazilian professor and researcher Rogério M. Pinto, and Michigan artist Nicholas Williams, who he worked with on "TIME", a piece of performance art at the Forge in Detroit.

== Hosta Press ==
In 2018, Pratt founded Hosta Press, an independent press based in Ann Arbor, formed of editors and designers who have a passion for art and thought. Their purpose is to pursue prose, poetry and art with a queer focus. Their first published material was Pratt's Todd Sweeney: The Fiend of Fleet High in April 2019.

== Award nominations ==
The book that has gained Pratt the most critical acclaim has been Bob the book, as it gained him the 2011 Lambda Literary Award for Gay Debut fiction, as well as a 2011 TLA GAYBIE nomination for Best Fiction, and a place on the Short List for Best Novel in the 2011 Gaylactic Spectrum Award.

== Bibliography ==
=== Young adult books ===
Gay Literature

- Wallaçonia (2017) ISBN 0-9981-2620-9; ISBN 978-0-9981-2620-3

=== Adult books ===
Gay Literature

- Bob the Book (2010) ISBN 0-9844-7071-9; ISBN 978-0-9844-7071-6
- Looking After Joey (2017) ISBN 1-5902-1685-7; ISBN 978-1-5902-1685-9
- Todd Sweeney: The Fiend of Fleet High (2019) ISBN 1-7329-4140-8; ISBN 978-1-7329-4140-3

Short fiction

- My Movie (2012) ISBN 0-9832-8517-9; ISBN 978-0-9832-8517-5
