= William Pratt (priest) =

William Pratt (1732–1770) was an Anglican priest in Ireland.

Pratt was born in Northamptonshire, the son of the Rev. David Pratt of Plumton, and was educated at Wadham College, Oxford. He was the Dean of Cloyne from 1769 until his death a year later.

In 1763, at Bandon, County Cork, Pratt preached a sermon to the Friendly Brothers of St Patrick, an Irish fraternity. on Benevolence and Friendship. It was published in Cork.
