= Mary Pratt =

Mary Pratt may refer to:

- Mary Ann Pratt (1809–1891), American midwife and early member of the Latter Day Saint movement
- Mary Louise Pratt (born 1948), American professor of Spanish and Portuguese languages and literature
- Mary Pradd, English woman murdered in 1876
- Mary Pratt (baseball) (1918−2020), American former baseball pitcher
- Mary Pratt (painter) (1935–2018), Canadian painter
