= Tom Pratt (footballer, born 1995) =

English footballer

Personal information
- Date of birth: 3 June 1995 (age 31)
- Place of birth: Manchester, England
- Height: 5 ft 10 in (1.78 m)
- Position: Forward

Team information
- Current team: Abbey Hey

Senior career*
Years	Team	Apps	(Gls)
2013–2014	Bury	2	(0)
2013	→ Mossley (loan)		
2014	Mossley		
2014–2017	Ashton United		
2017	Trafford		
2017–2023	Hyde United	222	(62)
2023–2024	Guiseley	24	(6)
2024	→ Marine (loan)	1	(0)
2024	→ Nantwich Town (loan)	3	(0)
2024–2025	Nantwich Town	0	(0)
2025-	Hyde United	18	(2)
2026–	Abbey Hey (loan)	1	(0)
- * Club domestic league appearances and goals as of w2:34, 22 November 2026 (UTC)

Thomas Pratt (born 3 June 1995) is an English footballer who plays as a forward for NWCFL Premier Division club Abbey Hey on loan from Northern Premier League Premier Division club Hyde United.

== Career ==
Pratt began his career with Bury and made his professional debut on 13 April 2013 in a 1–0 defeat against Oldham Athletic, and later went on loan to Mossley in August 2013. He left Bury having mutually terminated his contract on 4 January 2014.

Pratt joined Ashton United on 23 June 2014.

in June 2017 he joined Trafford.

Later that year he moved to Hyde United. establishing himself as a cult hero at Hyde due to the effort he puts in to every performance.

In May 2023, Pratt signed for Northern Premier League Premier Division club Guiseley. On 24 January 2024, he was loaned to Marine until 3 March but he was recalled on 23 February.

In June 2024, Pratt joined Nantwich Town on a permanent basis having had a short loan spell with the club the previous season.

In May 2025, Pratt rejoined Hyde United on a permanent basis, rejoining the tigers.
