= Frederick Haven Pratt =

American physiologist

Frederick Haven Pratt (19 July 1873 – 11 July 1958) was an American physiologist and served as a professor at Boston University from 1921 to his retirement. He contributed to early experimental studies on the electrical stimulation of muscles, developing techniques and instrumentation for the purpose.

Pratt was born in Worcester, Massachusetts, where his father Frederick Sumner was a prominent businessman, and Sarah McKean née Hilliard. He went to local preparatory schools, receiving an AB (1896) and AM (1898) before joining Harvard University for his master's degree. Here he worked on the role of the veins of Thebesius in heart nutrition, examining also the historical views of Emanuel Swedenborg. He also went to study briefly at the University of Göttingen and returned to work at the Worcester Polytechnic Institute. In 1901 he joined as an assistant at Harvard University and received an MD in 1906. Prominent influences included his teacher John Farquhar Fulton. He taught at Wellesley College until 1912 and moved to the University of Buffalo. Pratt examined muscle fibre contraction and confirmed the "all-or-none" principle using techniques that he adapted. This included a capillary electrode with a pore of 8 μm to stimulate single muscle fibres from a frog. He served as an honorary professor at Clark University and as a teaching fellow at Harvard. He became a professor at the University of Boston in 1921 and continued thereafter, retiring emeritus in 1942. He later headed Harvard Apparatus Company that produced instruments for physiology research.

Pratt married Margery Willard Davis (1887-1964) in 1912 and they had five children. Pratt also took a keen interest in creative photography and sailing. His photographs were entered into the 1904 Toronto salon and at other exhibitions. Alfred Stieglitz included his photographs in various exhibitions associated with the Photo Secession. Pratt also took an interest in history and apart from medical history, he examined life during the Revolutionary period.
