= Ann Pratt =

Jamaican author about Kingston Lunatic Asylum

Ann Pratt (born 1830) was a mixed-race mulatto woman from Hanover Parish, Jamaica, recognised for her pan-British Empire influencing pamphlet called Seven Months in the Kingston Lunatic Asylum and what I Saw There, August 21, 1860. The pamphlet told her firsthand accounts and observations of torture, beatings, near-drownings and persistent mistreatment towards the female patients in Jamaica's Kingston Lunatic Asylum, during her own time there as a patient.

== Life and work ==
Ann was born in 1830 in Hanover Parish, Jamaica, to mixed parentage. In Pratt's pamphlet, she detailed having two children before her admittance. She also details her experience being raped in 1859, for which she was tried in court, and during the process, she experienced a mental breakdown. Having originally been sent to a female prison, she was then transferred to Kingston Asylum after she was declared psychologically unfit.

=== Pratt's Pamphlet ===
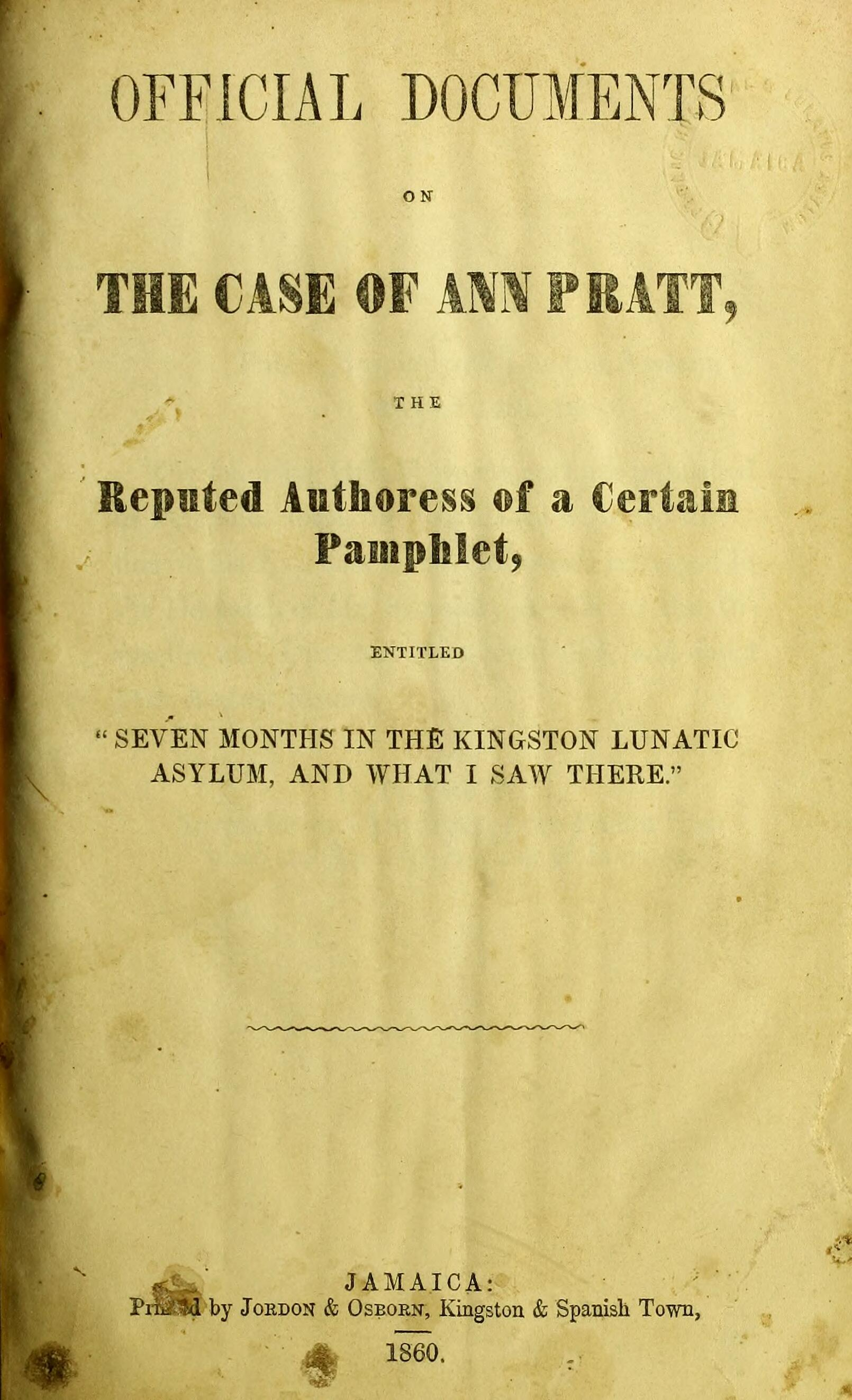
'The Case of Ann Pratt, The Reputed Authoress of a Certain Document', 1860. Published after the dissemination of Pratt's original pamphlet, this document aimed to repute its allegations.

After her release from the Asylum, Pratt published a small pamphlet called Seven Months in the Kingston Lunatic Asylum and what I Saw There, August 21, 1860.

In the pamphlet's preface, Ann states "My object in coming before the public with the following facts [is] to make known to all, whom it concerns, the actual treatment of the unfortunate people that came within the walls of Kingston Lunatic Asylum." In the pages of Ann's influential pamphlet, she details briefly her early life leading up to her admittance to Kingston Lunatic Asylum.

According to Jones: "In her pamphlet Ann Pratt graphically described the worst of these 'acts of cruelty and ill-usage' – the practice of tanking – after Judith Ryan, the matron of the lunatic asylum, had ordered that [Pratt] be tanked ... forcibly holding patients under water." Pratt said that during daily baths, she was tanked multiple times in quick succession. When a fellow inmate died from the procedure, the matron and her two assistants were charged with manslaughter, but they were acquitted by a jury. In spite of the acquittal, news of the practice became a public scandal. According to Jones, a government enquiry in 1861 found that Pratt's "accusations were largely true."

=== Asylum's rebuttal pamphlet ===
With the publication of Pratt's influential pamphlet, the Public Hospital and Lunatic Asylum of Jamaica printed its own 55-page pamphlet called "Official documents on the case of Ann Pratt, the Reputed Authoress of a Certain Pamphlet." It details Pratt's allegations as well as testimony given by other patients and workers at the Asylum.

=== Results of Pratt's pamphlet ===
Following the publication of Pratt's account, there were immediate staff reforms within Kingston's Lunatic Asylums; including the dismissals of the alleged key perpetrators of the abuse and the start of a local inquiry, in 1861, into colonial asylum governance across Kingston. Subsequently, the pamphlet has been identified as crucial in creating greater awareness of said poor practices across many British colonies at the time and leading to a subsequent investigation across the British Empire's entire colonial asylum system.
