= Tommy Pratt =

Australian rules footballer, born 1905

Personal information
- Full name: Thomas Pratt
- Born: 10 October 1905; Prahran, Victoria
- Died: 24 August 1992 (aged 86)
- Height: 175 cm (5 ft 9 in)
- Weight: 70 kg (154 lb)

Playing career^{1}
Years	Club	Games (Goals)
1929	Fitzroy	11 (3)
- ^{1} Playing statistics correct to the end of 1929.

Thomas Pratt (10 October 1905 – 24 August 1992) was an Australian rules footballer who played with Fitzroy in the Victorian Football League (VFL).

== Family ==
The son of Charlotte Barbara Bicknell and an unknown father, Thomas Bicknell was born at Prahran on 10 October 1905. When his mother married Arthur Vaughan Pratt in 1911, Bicknell took the family name Pratt.

== War service ==
Pratt later served in the Australian Army during World War II.
