= Hann =

Hann may refer to:

== People ==
- Adam Hann-Byrd (born 1982), American actor
- Allie Hann-McCurdy (born 1987), Canadian ice dancer
- Chris Hann (born 1953), British social anthropologist
- David Hann (born 1952), American politician
- Della Hann, American psychologist and research administrator
- Dorothy Hann, American beauty queen
- Frank Hann (1846–1921), Australian explorer
- Georg Hann (1897–1950), Austrian operatic bass-baritone
- Jason Hann, American percussionist
- Judith Hann (born 1942), English broadcaster and writer specialising in science
- Julius von Hann (1839–1921), Austrian meteorologist
- Les Hann (1911–1988), English footballer
- Marjorie Hann (1916–2011), South Australian painter and art teacher
- Matthew Hann (born 1980), English footballer
- Ng Tian Hann (born 1969), Malaysian Chinese movie director
- Quinten Hann (born 1977), Australian snooker player
- William Hann (1837–1889), Australian explorer and cattleman
- William Henry Hann (1831–1912), English violist, head of a musical family:
  - Edward Hopkins Hann (1861–1929), violin, founding member of London Symphony Orchestra
  - William Charles Hann (1863–1926), cellist, Philharmonic Orchestra
  - Lewis Robert Hann (1865–1937), violinist, composer, music professor at Cheltenham Ladies College
  - Sydney Herbert Hann (1867–1921), organist, pianist, hymn tune composer, teacher
  - Clement Walter Hann (1870–1921), cellist, 2nd violin, Philharmonic Orchestra
  - Marianne Sophia Hann (1878–1926), mezzo-soprano, teacher
- Wong Choong Hann (born 1977), Malaysian badminton player
- Hann Trier (1915–1999), German artist

== Places ==
- Hann, Senegal
- Hann Land District, a region of the State of Western Australia
- Hann. Münden, a town in Lower Saxony, Germany
- Hann River, a river in the Kimberley region of Western Australia
- Han (state) (韓) state in China, called Hann to distinguish it from the homophonic Han (漢) state

== Other uses ==
- Hann function, a mathematical function often used as a window function
- "Hann (Alone)", a 2018 song by (G)I-dle
- "Hann (Alone In winter)", a 2021 song by (G)I-dle from their 4th Korean EP "I Burn"
