= Dellai =

Dellai is a surname. Notable people with the surname include:

- Ana María Dellai (1929–1986), Argentinean alpine skier
- Lorenzo Dellai (born 1959), Italian politician

== See also ==
- Della (name)
