= Biomedical research in the United States =

American biomedical research

The US carries out 46% of global research and development (R&D) in the life sciences, making it the world leader in medical research.

== Federal expenditure on biomedical research ==
Life sciences accounted for 51% of federal research expenditure in 2011.

Research budget by US agency, 1994–2014. Source: Figure 5.4 from UNESCO Science Report: towards 2030, based on data from the American Association for the Advancement of Science.

The National Institutes of Health (NIH) are considered the government's flagship biomedical research funding organization. Between 2004 and 2014, NIH funding remained relatively flat and was not increased to keep pace with inflation. The NIH budget peaked at circa $35 billion per year from 2003 to 2005 and was around $30 billion in 2015.

Government efforts to increase allocations to research between 2013 and 2016 were often thwarted by the congressional austerity drive, with Congress withholding approval of the federal government's budget several times. Over this period, the executive's priorities were taken forward largely thanks to collaboration between the government, industry and the non-profit sector. This was particularly true for the health sector which, like climate change, was a priority for the Obama administration.

== Towards more targeted therapies ==
A key policy objective of the Obama administration was to develop more targeted therapies while reducing the time and cost of drug development. Developing a new drug takes well over a decade and has a failure rate of more than 95%. The most expensive failures happen in late phase clinical trials. It is thus vital to pinpoint the right biological targets (genes, proteins and other molecules) early in the process, so as to design more rational drugs and better tailored therapies.

The 21st Century Cures Act was signed into law on 13 December 2016, a year after the release of the UNESCO Science Report. The report had predicted that:

were the bill to pass into law, it would alter the way in which clinical trials are conducted by allowing new and adaptive trial designs that factor in personalized parameters, such as biomarkers and genetics. This provision has proven controversial, with doctors cautioning that overreliance on biomarkers as a measure of efficacy can be misleading, as they may not always reflect improved patient outcomes.

Another government scheme hopes to increase the number of new diagnostics and therapies for patients, while reducing the time and cost of developing these. At the launch of the Accelerating Medicines Partnership in February 2014, NIH director Francis S. Collins stated that "Currently, we are investing too much money and time in avenues that don't pan out, while patients and their families wait." Over the five years to 2019, this public−private partnership is developing up to five pilot projects for three common but difficult-to-treat diseases: Alzheimer's disease, type 2 (adult onset) diabetes and the autoimmune disorders of rheumatoid arthritis and lupus.

Proportional allocation of federal research funding in the US by discipline, 1994–2011 (%). Source: Figure 5.5 from UNESCO Science Report: towards 2030, based on data from American Association for Advancement of Science.

The partnership involves the National Institutes of Health (NIH) and the Food and Drug Administration (FDA), as well as 10 major biopharmaceutical companies and several non-profit organizations like the Alzheimer's Association. The industrial partners are Abbvie (US), Biogen (US), Bristol Myers Squibb (US), GlaxoSmithKline (UK), Johnson & Johnson (US), Lilly (US), Merck (US), Pfizer (US), Sanofi (France) and Takeda (Japan).

Laboratories share samples, such as blood or brain tissue from deceased patients, to identify biomarkers. They also participate in NIH clinical trials. One critical component is that industry partners have agreed to make the data and analyses arising from the partnership accessible to the broad biomedical community. They will not use any discoveries to develop their own drug until these findings have been made public.

In April 2013, the government announced another public−private partnership, this time to implement its Brain Research through Advancing Innovative Neurotechnologies (BRAIN) Initiative. The goal of this project is to leverage genetic, optical and imaging technologies to map individual neurons and complex circuits in the brain, eventually leading to a more complete understanding of this organ's structure and function. By 2015, the BRAIN Initiative had "obtained commitments of over US$ 300 million in resources from federal agencies (National Institutes of Health, Food and Drug Administration, National Science Foundation, etc.), industry (National Photonics Initiative, General Electric, Google, GlaxoSmithKline, etc.) and philanthropy (foundations and universities)".

The Precision Medicine Initiative has been another government priority. Defined as delivering the right treatment to the right patient at the right time, precision medicine tailors treatments to patients based on their unique physiology, biochemistry and genetics. In his 2016 budget request, the president asked for US$215 million to be shared by the NIH, National Cancer Institute and FDA to fund the Precision Medicine Initiative.

== Research spending by biopharmaceutical companies ==
In 2013, US pharmaceutical companies spent $40 billion on R&D inside the US and nearly another $11 billion on R&D abroad.

Between 2005 and 2010, pharmaceutical and biopharmaceutical companies increased their investment in precision medicine by roughly 75% and a further increase of 53% is projected by 2015. Between 12% and 50% of the products in their drug development pipelines are related to personalized medicine.

The federal government and most of the 50 states that make up the United States offer R&D tax credits to particular industries and companies. Congress usually renews a tax credit every few years. According to a survey by the Wall Street Journal in 2012, companies do not factor in these credits when making décisions about investing in R&D, since they cannot rely on these credits being renewed.

In 2014, six US biopharmaceutical companies figured in the global Top 50 for the volume of expenditure on R&D. The following have figured in the Top 20 for at least ten years: Intel, Microsoft, Johnson & Johnson, Pfizer and IBM. Google was included for the first time in 2013 and Amazon in 2014, which is why the online store does not figure in the Top 50 for 2014.

Global top 50 companies by R&D volume and intensity, 2014

Rank in 2014	Company	Country	Field	R&D (€ millions)	Change in rank for R&D, 2004–2014	R&D intensity*
1	Volkswagen	Germany	Automobiles & parts	11 743	+7	6.0
2	Samsung Electronics	Rep. Korea	Electronics	10 155	+31	6.5
3	Microsoft	US	Computer hardware and software	8 253	+10	13.1
4	Intel	US	Semiconductors	7 694	+10	20.1
5	Novartis	Switzerland	Pharmaceuticals	7 174	+15	17.1
6	Roche	Switzerland	Pharmaceuticals	7 076	+12	18.6
7	Toyota Motors	Japan	Automobiles & parts	6 270	-2	3.5
8	Johnson & Johnson	US	Medical equipment, pharmaceuticals, consumer goods	5 934	+ 4	11.5
9	Google	US	Internet-related products and services	5 736	+ 173	13.2
10	Daimler	Germany	Automobiles & parts	5 379	-7	4.6
11	General Motors	US	Automobiles & parts	5 221	-5	4.6
12	Merck USA	US	Pharmaceuticals	5 165	+17	16.2
13	BMW	Germany	Automobiles & parts	4 792	+15	6.3
14	Sanofi-Aventis	France	Pharmaceuticals	4 757	+8	14.4
15	Pfizer	US	Pharmaceuticals	4 750	-13	12.7
16	Robert Bosch	Germany	Engineering and electronics	4 653	+10	10.1
17	Ford Motors	US	Automobiles & parts	4 641	-16	4.4
18	Cisco Systems	US	Networking equipment	4 564	+13	13.4
19	Siemens	Germany	Electronics & electrical equipment	4 556	-15	6.0
20	Honda Motors	Japan	Automobiles & parts	4 367	4	5.4
21	Glaxosmithkline	UK	Pharmaceuticals & biotechnology	4 154	-10	13.1
22	IBM	US	Computer hardware, middleware & software	4 089	-13	5.7
23	Eli Lilly	US	Pharmaceuticals	4 011	+18	23.9
24	Oracle	US	Computer hardware & software	3 735	+47	13.5
25	Qualcomm	US	Semiconductors, telecommunications equipment	3 602	+112	20.0
26	Huawei	China	Telecommunications equipment and services	3 589	up > 200	25.6
27	Airbus	Netherlands**	Aeronautics	3 581	+8	6.0
28	Ericsson	Sweden	Telecommunications equipment	3 485	-11	13.6
29	Nokia	Finland	Technology hardware & equipment	3 456	9	14.7
30	Nissan Motors	Japan	Automobiles & parts	3 447	+4	4.8
31	General Electric	US	Engineering, electronics & electrical equipment	3 444	+6	3.3
32	Fiat	Italy	Automobiles & parts	3 362	+12	3.9
33	Panasonic	Japan	Electronics & electrical equipment	3 297	-26	6.2
34	Bayer	Germany	Pharmaceuticals & biotechnology	3 259	-2	8.1
35	Apple	US	Computer hardware & software	3 245	+120	2.6
36	Sony	Japan	Electronics & electrical equipment	3 209	-21	21.3
37	Astrazeneca	UK	Pharmaceuticals & biotechnology	3 203	-12	17.2
38	Amgen	US	Pharmaceuticals & biotechnology	2 961	+18	21.9
39	Boehringer Ingelheim	Germany	Pharmaceuticals & biotechnology	2 743	+23	19.5
40	Bristol–Myers Squibb	US	Pharmaceuticals & biotechnology	2 705	+2	22.8
41	Denso	Japan	Automobile parts	2 539	+12	9.0
42	Hitachi	Japan	Technology hardware & equipment	2 420	-18	3.7
43	Alcatel–Lucent	France	Technology hardware & equipment	2 374	+4	16.4
44	EMC	US	Computer software	2 355	+48	14.0
45	Takeda Pharmaceuticals	Japan	Pharmaceuticals & biotechnology	2 352	+28	20.2
46	SAP	Germany	Software & computer services	2 282	+23	13.6
47	Hewlett–Packard	US	Technology hardware & equipment	2 273	-24	2.8
48	Toshiba	Japan	Computer hardware	2 269	-18	5.1
49	LG Electronics	Korea, Rep.	Electronics	2 209	+61	5.5
50	Volvo	Sweden	Automobiles & parts	2 131	+27	6.9

* R&D intensity is defined as R&D expenditure divided by net sales.

** Although incorporated in the Netherlands, Airbus's principal manufacturing facilities are located in France, Germany, Spain and the UK.

Source: UNESCO Science Report: towards 2030 (2015), Table 9.3, based on Hernández et al. (2014) EU R&D Scoreboard: the 2014 EU Industrial R&D Investment Scoreboard. European Commission: Brussels, Table 2.2.

== Trends in venture capital investment ==
The National Venture Capital Association has reported that, in 2014, venture capital investment in the life sciences was at its highest level since 2008: in biotechnology, $6.0 billion was invested in 470 deals and, in life sciences overall, $8.6 billion in 789 deals (including biotechnology and medical devices). Two-thirds (68%) of the investment in biotechnology went to first-time/early-stage development deals and the remainder to the expansion stage of development (14%), seed-stage companies (11%) and late-stage companies (7%).

However, it was the software industry which invested in the greatest number of deals overall: 1799, for an investment of $19.8 billion. Second came internet-specific companies, garnering US$11.9 billion in investment through 1 005 deals. Many of these companies are based in the State of California, which alone concentrates 28% of US research.

Total investment in venture capital amounted to US$48.3 billion in 2014, for 4 356 deals. This represented "an increase of 61% in dollars and a 4% increase in deals over the prior year," reported the National Venture Capital Association.

The Organisation for Economic Cooperation and Development estimates that venture capital investment in the United States had fully recovered by 2014.

In recent years, a number of pharmaceutical companies have made strategic mergers to relocate their headquarters overseas to gain a tax advantage, including Medtronic and Endo International. Pfizer's own attempt to take over the British pharmaceutical company AstraZeneca aborted in 2014 after Pfizer admitted plans to cut research spending in the combined company.

== Trends in prescription drug prices ==
One policy concern for the Obama administration has been the steep rise in the price of prescription drugs, in a country where these prices are largely unregulated. From January 2008 to December 2014, the price of commonly used branded drugs increased by a little over 127%, even as the price of commonly prescribed generic drugs decreased by almost 63%.

In 2014, spending on prescription drugs hit $374 billion. This increase in spending was fuelled by the costly new drugs on the market for treating hepatitis C ($11 billion), rather than by the millions of newly insured Americans under the Patient Protection and Affordable Care Act of 2010 ($1 billion). "About 31% of this spending went on specialty drug therapies to treat inflammatory conditions, multiple sclerosis, oncology, hepatitis C and HIV, etc., and 6.4% on traditional therapies to treat diabetes, high cholesterol, pain, high blood pressure and heart disease, asthma, depression and so on."

Fuelling the "astronomic" rise in consumer prices for prescription drugs has been a new trend in the US, the acquisition of pharmaceuticals through licensing, purchase, a merger or acquisition. In the first half of 2014, the value of mergers and acquisitions by pharmaceutical companies totalled US$317.4 billion and, in the first quarter of 2015, the drug industry accounted for a little more than 45% of all US mergers and acquisitions. Several pharmaceutical companies have made strategic mergers in recent years to relocate their headquarters overseas to order to gain a tax advantage. Pfizer's own attempt to take over the British pharmaceutical company Astrazeneca aborted in 2014, after Pfizer admitted plans to cut research spending in the combined company.

== Bringing down the cost to consumers ==
The Biologics Price Competition and Innovation Act was signed into law in March 2010 to encourage the development of generic drug competition as a cost containment measure for high-priced pharmaceuticals. Part of the government's signatory Patient Protection and Affordable Care Act, it has created a pathway for fast-track licensure for biological products that are shown to be "biosimilar" to, or "interchangeable" with, an approved biological product. One inspiration for the act was that the patents for many biologic drugs will expire in the next decade.

Although the act was passed in 2010, the first biosimilar was only approved in the US by the FDA in 2015: Zarxio, made by Sandoz. Zarxio is a biosimilar of the cancer drug Neupogen, which boosts the patient's white blood cells to ward off infection. In September 2015, a US court ruled that the Neupogen brand manufacturer Amgen could not block Zarxio from being sold in the US. Neupogen costs about US$3 000 per chemotherapy cycle; Zarxio hit the US market on 3 September 2015 at a 15% discount.

In Europe, the same drug had been approved as early as 2008 and has been safely marketed there ever since. The lag in development of an approval pathway in the US has been criticized for impeding access to biological therapies.

The true cost savings from the use of biosimilars is difficult to assess. A 2014 study by the Rand Institute estimates a range of US$13–66 billion in savings over 2014–2024, depending upon the level of competition and FDA regulatory approval patterns.

Unlike generics, biosimilars cannot be approved on the basis of minimal and inexpensive tests to prove bioequivalence. Since biological drugs are complex, heterogeneous products derived from living cells, they can only be shown to be highly similar to the appropriate reference product and therefore require demonstration that there are no clinically meaningful differences in safety and efficacy. The extent to which clinical trials are required will largely determine the cost of development.

== Orphan drugs ==
Orphan diseases affect fewer than 200 000 Americans each year. Since the Orphan Drug Act of 1983, over 400 drugs and biologic products for rare diseases have been designated by the Food and Drug Administration (as of 2015), 260 alone in 2013. In 2014, sales of the top 10 orphan drugs in the US amounted to US$18.32 billion; by 2020, orphan drugs sales worldwide are projected to account for 19% (US$28.16 billion) of the total US$176 billion in prescription drug spending.

However, orphan drugs cost about 19.1 times more than non-orphan drugs (on an annual basis) in 2014, at an average annual cost per patient of US$137,782. Some are concerned that the incentives given to pharmaceutical companies to develop orphan drugs by the FDA's orphan drug products programme is taking the companies' attention away from developing drugs that will benefit more of the population.

== Medical devices ==
There are more than 6500 medical device companies in the US, more than 80% of which have fewer than 50 employees. According to the US Department of Commerce, the market size of the medical device industry in the US is expected to reach US$133 billion by 2016.

Observers foresee the further development and emergence of wearable health monitoring devices, telediagnosis and telemonitoring, robotics, biosensors, three-dimensional (3D) printing, new in vitro diagnostic tests and mobile apps that enable users to monitor their health and related behaviour better.

== Trends in pharmaceutical exports and patents ==
High-tech exports from the United States as a world share, 2008–2013, data from Comtrade database, taken from UNESCO Science Report: towards 2030 (2015), Figure 5.10

Until 2010, the United States of America was a net exporter of pharmaceuticals. Since 2011, it has become a net importer of these goods. The United States has lost its world leadership for high-tech goods. Even computing and communications equipment is now assembled in China and other emerging economies, with high-tech value-added components being produced elsewhere.

The United States is a post-industrial country. Imports of high-tech products far exceed exports. However, the United States' technologically skilled workforce produces a large volume of patents and can still profit from the license or sale of these patents. Within the United States' scientific industries active in research, 9.1% of products and services are concerned with the licensing of intellectual property rights.

When it comes to trade in intellectual property, the United States remains unrivalled. Income from royalties and licensing amounted to $129.2 billion in 2013, the highest in the world. Japan comes a distant second, with receipts of $31.6 billion in 2013. The United States' payments for use of intellectual property amounted to $39.0 billion in 2013, exceeded only by Ireland ($46.4 billion).

== See also ==
- Health care in the United States
- Science policy in the United States
- Science and technology in the United States

== Sources ==
This article incorporates text from a free content work. Licensed under CC-BY-SA IGO 3.0. Text taken from UNESCO Science Report: towards 2030, UNESCO.
