= Della (name) =

Della is a female given name, a diminutive of Delia or a variant of Adela. Notable people with the name include:

== Given name ==
- Della Au Belatti (born 1974), Democratic member of the Hawaii House of Representatives
- Della Davidson (1951–2012), American modern dancer and choreographer
- Della Ding (born 1982), or Ding Dang, Chinese pop singer
- Della Hann, American psychologist and research administrator
- Della Jones (born 1946), Welsh opera and concert mezzo-soprano singer
- Della Campbell MacLeod (ca. 1884 – ?), American author and journalist
- Della Moore (c. 1880–1926), American prostitute
- Della Purves (1945–2008), British botanical artist
- Della Reese (1931–2017), American jazz and gospel singer, and actress
- Della Sehorn (1927–2001), competitive breaststroke swimmer
- Della Warrior (born 1946), Native American tribal leader
- Della Woods (born 1940), dragster driver

== Fictional characters ==
- Della Alexander, a character in the soap opera EastEnders
- Della Dillingham Young, one of the main characters of the short story The Gift of the Magi by O. Henry
- Della Duck, twin sister of Donald Duck and mother of Huey, Dewey, and Louie
- Della Fairchild, mother of Sabrina and cook to the Larrabees in Samuel A. Taylor’s play Sabrina Fair.
- Della Street, the secretary of Perry Mason
- Radelle "Della" Adara Vacker, a protagonist in the young-adult fantasy series Keeper of the Lost Cities by Shannon Messenger.
- Adaline “Della” Bowman, from the movie “Age of Adaline” with Blake Lively

== Surname ==
- George W. Della Jr. (born 1943), American politician
- John Della Volpe, American pollster and writer
- Ralph Della-Volpe (1923–2017), American painter, teacher

== Surname component ==
- Piero della Francesca (c. 1415 – 1492), Italian Renaissance painter
- Della Gherardesca family of the republic of Pisa
- Ivan Della Mea (1940–2009), Italian actor, writer and singer
- Giovanni Pico della Mirandola (1463–1494) Italian nobleman and philosopher
- Giambattista della Porta (1535–1615) Neapolitan polymath
- Della Rovere, Italian noble family
- Della Scala, the Scaliger Veronese noble family
- Della Torre or Torriani, Lombard noble family
