= Les Hann =

English footballer

Personal information
- Full name: Leslie Hann
- Date of birth: 3 June 1911
- Place of birth: Gateshead, England
- Date of death: 1988 (aged 76–77)
- Height: 5 ft 8 1/2 in (1.74 m)
- Positions: Inside left; left half

Senior career*
Years	Team	Apps	(Gls)
- Windy Nook
1934	West Ham United	0	(0)
- Ashington
- Blyth Spartans
–1936	Felling Red Star		
1936–1939	Accrington Stanley	29	(1)
1939	Clapton Orient	0	(0)
- * Club domestic league appearances and goals

Leslie Hann (3 June 1911 – 1988) was an English professional footballer who played in the Football League for Accrington Stanley as an inside left.
