= Della Hann =

American psychologist and research administrator

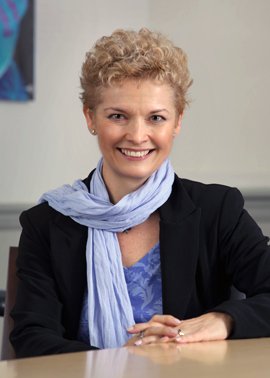
- Hann in 2015
- Born: Gettysburg, Pennsylvania, US
- Education: Catawba College (BS); University of Tennessee (PhD)
- Scientific career
- Fields: Psychology, research administration
- Workplaces: National Institutes of Health
- Thesis: Factors that influence the quality of maternal care: a systemic conceptualization (1986)
- Doctoral advisor: Robert Wahler

Della Marie Hann is an American psychologist and research administrator serving as the associate director for extramural research at the Eunice Kennedy Shriver National Institute of Child Health and Human Development.

== Early life and education ==
Della Marie Hahn is from Gettysburg, Pennsylvania. She completed a B.S. from Catawba College in 1981. In 1986, she earned a Ph.D. in experimental psychology with an emphasis on issues of early child development from the University of Tennessee. Her dissertation was titled Factors that influence the quality of maternal care: a systemic conceptualization. Her doctoral advisor was Robert Wahler. She held a postdoctoral fellowship from the MacArthur Foundation in the department of psychiatry at the Medical Center of Louisiana at New Orleans. There, Hann participated in research related to early socio-emotional development in infants of adolescent mothers.

== Career ==
Hann joined the National Institutes of Health (NIH) in 1991 as a program officer and chief of the Interpersonal and Family Processes Program within the National Institute of Mental Health (NIMH) Behavioral, Cognitive, and Social Sciences Research Branch. She has since held a variety of leadership roles both within NIMH and the NIH Office of Extramural Research (OER), including senior policy advisor in OER and director of the Office of Science Policy, Planning and Communications at NIMH. There, Hann led and directed programs on science policy and program evaluation, strategic planning, scientific disease coding and analysis, and internal and external communications and dissemination. Hann served as associate director for research training and scientific collaborations with the NIMH Division of Mental Disorders, Behavioral Research, and AIDS.

Starting in 2008, Hann was acting OER deputy director, while at the same time serving as the acting director for the NIMH Office of Autism Research Coordination at the National Institute for Mental Health (NIMH). In that capacity, she provided leadership and management for the congressionally mandated Interagency Autism Coordinating Committee (IACC). She led the IACC's first national strategic plan. In 2010, she was appointed deputy director of OER.

In 2015, Hann became the associate director for extramural research at the Eunice Kennedy Shriver National Institute of Child Health and Human Development (NICHD). She serves at the director of NICHD's principal advisor on extramural scientific and policy issues.

== Selected works ==
- Carter, Sheena L.; Osofsky, Joy D.; Hann, Della M. (1991). "Speaking for the baby: A therapeutic intervention with adolescent mothers and their infants". Infant Mental Health Journal. 12 (4): 291–301. doi:10.1002/1097-0355(199124)12:4<291::AID-IMHJ2280120403>3.0.CO;2-3. ISSN 1097-0355.
- Osofsky, Joy D.; Wewers, Sarah; Hann, Della M.; Fick, Ana C. (1993). "Chronic Community Violence: What Is Happening to Our Children?". Psychiatry. 56 (1): 36–45. doi:10.1080/00332747.1993.11024619. ISSN 0033-2747. PMID 8488211.
- Osofsky, Joy D.; Hann, Della M.; Peebles, C. (1993). "Adolescent parenthood: Risks and opportunities for mothers and infants". In Zeanah, Charles H. Jr. (ed.). Handbook of Infant Mental Health. Guilford Press. pp. 106–119. ISBN 9780898629965.
- Hubbs-Tait, Laura; Osofsky, Joy D.; Hann, Della M.; Culp, Anne McDonald (1994). "Predicting Behavior Problems and Social Competence in Children of Adolescent Mothers". Family Relations. 43 (4): 439–446. doi:10.2307/585376. JSTOR 585376. S2CID 144573724.
- Hann, Della M., ed. (2001). Taking Stock of Risk Factors for Child/Youth Externalizing Behavior Problems (PDF). ERIC Clearinghouse. OCLC 1062940445.
