= Dorothy Hann =

- Born: Dorothy Irene Hann; March 2, 1913; Camden, New Jersey, U.S.
- Died: July 22, 1990 (aged 77); Camden, New Jersey, U.S.
- Title: Miss Camden County 1931; Unofficial Miss America 1932
- Predecessor: Lois Delander
- Successor: Marian Bergeron
- Spouse: Albert J. Chapman (died 1982)

Dorothy Irene Hann (March 2, 1913 – July 22, 1990) was unofficially Miss America in 1932.

Hann, from Camden, New Jersey was the first Miss America "crowned" since 1927, due to an absence of pageants due to the Great Depression. The pageant was held in Wildwood, New Jersey instead of the traditional Atlantic City. There were no parades or other big attractions held on this day due to the high cost that the businesses could not afford during the Great Depression. On the Miss America website it states that no pageant was held in 1932. The pageant won by Hann is regarded as unofficial.

Hann was married to Albert J. Chapman until his death in 1982. She died on July 22, 1990, in her hometown of Camden, New Jersey.

Preceded by Lois Delander	Unofficial Miss America; 1932	Succeeded by Marian Bergeron
