= Science policy of the United States =

Government support and limits of scientific research

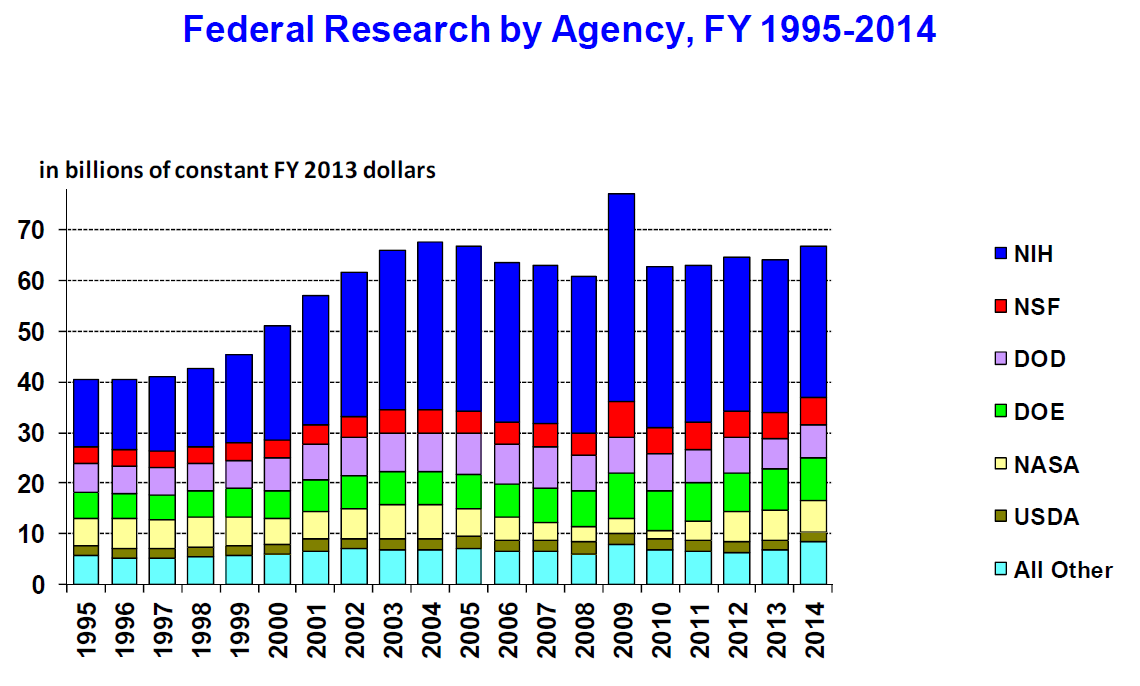
Federal funding of basic and applied research by year. The spike in 2009 is due to the American Reinvestment and Recovery Act. Figures for 2014 are requested levels.

The science policy of the United States is the responsibility of many organizations throughout the federal government. Much of the large-scale policy is made through the legislative budget process of enacting the yearly federal budget, although there are other legislative issues that directly involve science, such as energy policy, climate change, and stem cell research. Further decisions are made by the various federal agencies which spend the funds allocated by the United States Congress, either on in-house research or by granting funds to outside organizations and researchers.

At the beginning of Donald Trump's second term in 2025, head of DOGE, Elon Musk, initiated a rapid reorganization of the federal scientific infrastructure, dismissing thousands of employees—particularly those involved in public health and climate research, including NOAA weather forecasters.

The US is losing leadership of most critical technology to China, according to the Australian Strategic Policy Institute.

The United States devoted 2.8% of GDP to research and development (R&D) in 2012. The private sector contributed two-thirds of the total. The Obama administration had fixed a target of a 3% ratio by the end of his presidency in 2016.

== Legislating science policy ==
In the Executive Office of the President, the main body advising the president on science policy is the Office of Science and Technology Policy. Other advisory bodies exist within the Executive Office of the President, including the President's Council of Advisors on Science and Technology and the National Science and Technology Council.

In the United States Congress, a number of congressional committees have jurisdiction over legislation on science policy, most notably the House Committee on Science and Technology and the Senate Committee on Commerce, Science and Transportation, and their subcommittees. These committees oversee the various federal research agencies that are involved in receiving funding for scientific research. Oversight of some agencies may fall under multiple committees, for example the Environmental Protection Agency.

The number of Congressional members and other politicians with backgrounds in science, engineering, and technology has grown in recent years, with the 116th Congress setting a record with 47 of 535 members with STEM backgrounds. Therefore, most U.S. politicians refer to various Congressional support agencies for analysis on science related issues, which do not solely focus on science, but provide insight for Congress to make decisions dealing with scientific issues. These agencies are nonpartisan and provide objective reports on topics requested by members of congress. They are the Congressional Research Service, Government Accountability Office, and Congressional Budget Office. In the past, the Office of Technology Assessment provided Congressional members and committees with objective analysis of scientific and technical issues, but this office was abolished in 1994.

Further advice is provided by extragovernmental organizations such as The National Academies, which was created and mostly funded by the federal government, and the RAND Corporation, as well as other non-profit organizations such as the American Association for the Advancement of Science and the American Chemical Society among others.

== Research and development in the federal budget ==
Since the 1960s, private businesses in the U.S. have provided an increasing share of funding for research and development, as direct federal funding waned.

The research and development budget by department in the Obama administration's federal budget proposal for fiscal year 2015:

- Air Force: $23.74B
- Navy: $16.301B
- Army: $6.598B
- Other Defense: $18.225B
- NIH: $29.54B
- Other HHS: $1.529B
- Energy: $12.309B
- NASA: $11.555B
- NSF: $5.727B
- Agriculture: $2.447B
- Commerce (NIST & NOAA): $1.597B
- Veterans Affairs: $1.178B
- Interior: $0.925B
- Homeland Security: $0.876B
- Transportation: $0.865B
- EPA: $0.56B
- PCORI: $0.528B
- Education: $0.336B
- Smithsonian: $0.252B
- Other: $0.698B

Only a small percentage of the overall federal budget is allocated to R&D. The FY2015 budget request includes $135.110B in R&D spending out of a total budget of $3969.069B, representing 3.4% of the budget. Research and development funding in the federal budget is not centrally enacted, but is spread across many appropriations bills which are enacted in the annual United States budget process. Of the twelve annual appropriations bills, the most important for R&D are those for Defense; Labor, Health and Human Services, and Education (which includes NIH); Commerce, Justice, and Science (which includes NSF, NASA, NIST, and NOAA); and Energy and Water Development. Other appropriations bills include smaller amounts of R&D funding.

There are a number of federal agencies across the government which carry out science policy. Some of these primarily perform their own research "in-house", while others grant funds to external organizations or individual researchers. In addition, the federally funded research and development centers (FFRDC), which include most of the U.S. National Laboratories, are funded by the government but operated by universities, non-profit organizations, or for-profit consortia.

The FY2015 presidential budget request defines R&D as "the collection of efforts directed toward gaining greater knowledge or understanding and applying knowledge toward the production of useful materials, devices, and methods." R&D is divided into five subcategories. Basic research is directed toward understanding of the fundamental aspects of observable phenomena. It may be directed towards broad but not specific applications. Applied research is directed towards gaining knowledge to meet a recognized and specific need. Development is the application of knowledge or understanding for the production of useful materials, devices, and methods, including production of prototypes. R&D equipment includes acquisition or production of movable equipment, such as spectrometers, research satellites, or detectors. R&D facilities include the construction or major repairs to physical facilities including land, buildings, and fixed capital equipment such fixed facilities as reactors, wind tunnels, and particle accelerators.

The following chart shows a breakdown for the five agencies with the largest R&D budgets in the Obama administration's FY2015 proposal:

- Basic research
- Applied research
- Development
- Equipment and facilities

=== Defense research and development ===
Defense R&D has the goal of "maintaining strategic technological advantages over potential foreign adversaries." As of 2009, just over half of the R&D budget was allocated to defense spending. Most Defense R&D falls under the Research, Development, Test, and Evaluation (RTD&E) budget, although some R&D funding is outside this budget, such as the Defense Health Program and the chemical weapons destruction program. The Department of Defense divides development further, based on the character of the work performed, giving each category a funding code in its budget justification which is used by Congressional appropriation reports: 6.1 is Basic Research, 6.2 is Applied Research, 6.3 is Advanced Technology Development, 6.4 is Advanced Component Development and Prototypes, 6.5 is System Development and Demonstration, 6.6 is Research, Development, Test and Evaluation (RDT&E) Management and Support, and 6.7 is Operational Systems Development.

Most of the Defense R&D budget is for weapon systems development, with nearly all activity in categories 6.4 and higher carried out by private defense contractors. About one sixth of it is allocated to the Science and Technology (S&T) program, which includes all of 6.1, 6.2, 6.3, and medical research. As of 2013, research funding (6.1 and 6.2) was disbursed 40% to industry, 33% to DoD laboratories, and 21% to academia. The Department of Defense was the third-largest supporter of R&D in academia in FY2012, with only NIH and NSF having larger investments, with DoD the largest federal funder for engineering research and a close second for computer science.

The Defense Research Enterprise (DRE) consists of S&T programs within each of the three military departments within DoD. The budget is prepared by each department's acquisition secretary, namely the Assistant Secretary of the Air Force (Acquisition), Assistant Secretary of the Navy (Research, Development and Acquisition), and Assistant Secretary of the Army for Acquisition, Logistics, and Technology. Air Force and Space Force S&T is executed by the Air Force Research Laboratory (AFRL). Navy and Marine Corps S&T is executed by the Office of Naval Research (ONR), with medical research performed by the Navy Bureau of Medicine and Surgery. For the Army, 72% of the S&T budget is in Army Materiel Command's Research, Development and Engineering Command (RDECOM), with the remainder in Army Medical Research and Materiel Command (USAMRMC), Army Corps of Engineers (USACE), Army Space and Missile Defense Command (USASMDC) and the Deputy Chief of Staff (G1-Personnel) to the Assistant Secretary of the Army (Manpower and Reserve Affairs). Each agency supports both in-house intramural research as well as grants to outside academic or industrial organizations.

The following chart shows a breakdown for the agencies with the most R&D funding within the Department of Defense in the Obama administration's FY2015 proposal. The "Other" category includes $3.7B for classified programs such as NSA, DIA, and NGA, whose top-level budget numbers are not released, as well as the uncategorized R&D funds not included in the RDT&E budget.

- Basic Research (6.1)
- Applied Research (6.2)
- Advanced Technology Development (6.3)
- Advanced Component Development and Prototypes (6.4)
- System Development and Demonstration (6.5)
- Management and Support (6.6)
- Operational Systems Development (6.7)
- Uncategorized

The following information is based on a 2022 Congressional Research Service report. Approximately 97% ($119.3 billion) of DoD’s RDT&E funding for FY 2022 ($122.9 billion) is appropriated in Title IV (Research, Development, Test, and Evaluation), which includes appropriations for the Army, Navy, Air Force, Space Force (under the Air Force account), a Defense-wide RDT&E account, and the Director of Operational Test and Evaluation. The Defense-wide account includes the MDA, DARPA, OSD and 17 other DOD organizations. Below is a breakdown for FY 2022 DoD RDT&E by funding code:

6.1 Basic Research 2.3%; 6.2 Applied Research 5.8%; 6.3 Advanced Technology Development 7.7%; 6.4 Advanced Component Development and Prototypes 27.5%; 6.5 System Development and Demonstration 12.6%; 6.6 RDT&E Management Support 7.0%; 6.7 Operational System Development 36.4%; and 6.8 Software and Digital Technology Pilot Project 0.6%.

== Prize competitions ==
In 2010, Congress passed the America COMPETES Reauthorization Act of 2010 (P.L. 111-358; 15 U.S.C. §3719). The law provides the federal agencies with the broad authority to carry out prize competitions “to stimulate innovation that has the potential to advance the mission of the respective agency.” 15 U.S.C. §3718(c)(4). The term “federal agency” does "not include any agency of the legislative branch of the Federal Government." 15 U.S.C. §3719(a)(3).

In 2017, Congress passed the American Innovation and Competitiveness Act of 2017 (P.L. 114-329). Among the amendments to the America COMPETES Reauthorization Act of 2010, it authorized federal agencies to use "Federal appropriated funds and funds provided by private sector for-profit and nonprofit entities" as well as from state and local governments." 15 U.S.C. §3719(m)(1). P.L. 114-329 also provided federal agencies with the “explicit authority to use crowdsourcing and citizen science … to advance federal science agency missions and stimulate and facilitate broader public participation in the innovation process”

Challenge.gov contains a listing of active federal challenge and prize competitions. The website was launched in 2010 and is managed by the U.S. General Services Administration.

== Intellectual property policy ==
Inventions "conceived or actually reduced to practice" in the performance of government-funded research may be subject to the Bayh–Dole Act. Congress set forth the U.S. patent policy in the Bayh-Dole Act in 1980 (codified in 35 U.S. Code § 200 as implemented by 37 CFR part 401). The policy and objective, as stated in the Bayh-Dole Act, is "to use the patent system to promote the utilization of inventions arising from federally supported research or development," among others. This policy and objective is incorporated verbatim in the Federal Acquisition Regulation. Contractors may elect to retain title to any subject invention made in the performance of U.S. government-funded research. If it happens, U.S. Government will have a worldwide, nonexclusive, nontransferable, irrevocable, paid-up license to practice the invention, or have it practiced for or on behalf of the United States.

The Federal Research Public Access Act (111th congress S.1373, introduced 25 June 2009 but still in a Senate committee) would require "free online public access to such final peer-reviewed manuscripts or published versions as soon as practicable, but not later than 6 months after publication in peer-reviewed journals". The bill was later succeeded by the Fair Access to Science and Technology Research Act, which was introduced twice before it was introduced again in 115th Congress.

The Leahy-Smith America Invents Act of 2011 moved the United States from a 'first to invent' system to a 'first to file' model, the most significant patent reform since 1952. This act will limit or eliminate lengthy legal and bureaucratic challenges that used to accompany contested filings. However, the pressure to file early may limit the inventor's ability to exploit the period of exclusivity fully. It may also disadvantage very small entities, for which the legal costs of preparing an application are the main barrier to filing. This legislation has also fostered the rise of what are familiarly known as patent trolls.

== Science in political discourse ==
Most of the leading political issues in the United States have a scientific component. For example, healthcare, renewable energy, climate change, and national security. Amongst U.S. public opinion, 60% of Americans believe scientific experts should play an active role in policy debates over relevant issues, although this view is divided amongst Democrats and Republicans. Broadly, a majority of Americans believe that scientists should be involved in shaping policies related to medical and health, energy, education, environmental, infrastructure, defense, and agriculture policies.

=== Politicization of science ===
The General Social Survey (GSS) of 1974 recorded that conservatives had the highest rates of trust in science between the three major political demographics: conservatives, liberals, and moderates. This study was repeated annually between 1972 and 1994, and biannually from 1994 until 2010. In 2010, when the same study was repeated, conservatives' trust rates had decreased from 49% to 38%, moderates' trust rates from 45% to 40%, and liberals' trust rates staying relatively stable, rising slightly from 48% to 50%. The study by Gordon Gauchat, which investigates time trends in the public trust of science in the United States, suggests that the increase of distrust of conservatives can be attributed to two cultural shifts. The first was during the post-Ronald Reagan era when the New Right emerged, and the second during the George W. Bush era when the New Right intensified and conservatives commenced the "war on science". Since Bush's presidency, Barack Obama and other politicians have expressed their concerns with the politicization of science in both the public and government sphere. In 2011, during his State of the Union speech, Obama discussed his dissatisfaction of the relationships between organized science, private economic interests, and the government. A 2024 analysis found that 100 U.S. Representatives and 23 U.S. Senators—23% of the 535 members of Congress—were climate change deniers. All were Republicans.

== Science policy in the states ==
=== State government initiatives ===
There are also a number of state and local agencies which deal with state-specific science policy and provide additional funding, such as the California Institute for Regenerative Medicine and the Cancer Prevention and Research Institute of Texas.

=== Overall research spending in the states ===
Contribution of each state to US research in 2010, in terms of funding (public and private sectors) and science and engineering occupations. Source: Figure 5.6 from the UNESCO Science Report: towards 2030, based on data from National Science Foundation

The level of research spending varies considerably from one state to another. Six states (New Mexico, Maryland, Massachusetts, Washington, California and Michigan) each devoted 3.9% or more of their GDP to R&D in 2010, together contributing 42% of national research expenditure. In 2010, more than one-quarter of R&D was concentrated in California (28.1%), ahead of Massachusetts (5.7%), New Jersey (5.6%), Washington State (5.5%), Michigan (5.4%), Texas (5.2%), Illinois (4.8%), New York (3.6%) and Pennsylvania (3.5%). Seven states (Arkansas, Nevada, Oklahoma, Louisiana, South Dakota and Wyoming) devoted less than 0.8% of GDP to R&D.

California is home to Silicon Valley, the name given to the area hosting the leading corporations and start-ups in information technology. This state also hosts dynamic biotechnology clusters in the San Francisco Bay Area, Los Angeles and San Diego. The main biotechnology clusters outside California are the cities of Boston/Cambridge, Massachusetts, Maryland, suburban Washington DC, New York, Seattle, Philadelphia and Chicago. California supplies 13.7% of all jobs in science and engineering across the country, more than any other state. Some 5.7% of Californians are employed in these fields.

New Mexico's high research intensity can be explained by the fact that it hosts both Los Alamos National Laboratory and the primary campus of Sandia National Laboratories, the two major United States Department of Energy research and development national laboratories. Maryland's position may reflect the concentration of federally funded research institutions there. Washington State has a high concentration of high-tech firms like Microsoft, Amazon and Boeing and the engineering functions of most automobile manufacturers are located in the State of Michigan.

Microsoft, Intel and Google figured among the world's top 10 corporations for research spending in 2014. They shared this distinction with Johnson & Johnson, a multinational based in New Jersey which makes pharmaceutical and healthcare products, as well as medical devices, and were closely followed by automobile giant General Motors (11th), based in Detroit, and pharmaceutical companies Merck (12th) and Pfizer (15th). Merck is headquartered in New Jersey and Pfizer in New York. Intel's investment in R&D has more than doubled in the past 10 years, whereas Pfizer's investment has dropped since 2012. Several pharmaceutical companies figure among the top 15 corporations for research spending. The US carries out almost half (46%) of all research in the life sciences, making it the world leader. In 2013, US pharmaceutical companies spent US$40 billion on R&D inside the US and nearly another US$11 billion on R&D abroad. Some 7% of the companies on Thomson Reuters' Top 100 Global Innovators list for 2014 are active in biomedical research, equal to the number of businesses in consumer products and telecommunications.

== History ==
The first President's Science and Technology Advisor was James R. Killian, appointed in 1958 by President Dwight D. Eisenhower after Sputnik Shock created the urgency for the government to support science and education. President Eisenhower realized then that if Americans were going to continue to be the world leader in scientific, technological and military advances, the government would need to provide support. After World War II, the US government began to formally provide support for scientific research and to establish the general structure by which science is conducted in the US. The foundation for modern American science policy was laid way out in Vannevar Bush's Science – the Endless Frontier, submitted to President Truman in 1945. Vannevar Bush was President Roosevelt's science advisor and became one of the most influential science advisors as, in his essay, he pioneered how we decide on science policy today. He made recommendations to improve the following three areas: national security, health, and the economy—the same three focuses we have today.

=== Creation of the NSF ===
The creation of the National Science Foundation, although implemented in 1950, was a controversial issue that started as early as 1942, between engineer and science administrator Vannevar Bush and Senator Harley M. Kilgore (D-WV), who was interested in the organization of military research. Senator Kilgore presented a series of bills between 1942–1945 to Congress, the one that most resembles the establishment of the NSF, by name, was in 1944, outlining an independent agency whose main focus was to promote peacetime basic and applied research as well as scientific training and education. Some specifics outlined were that the director would be appointed and the board would be composed of scientists, technical experts and members of the public. The government would take ownership of intellectual property developed with federal funding and funding would be distributed based on geographical location, not merit. Although both Bush and Kilgore were in favor of government support of science, they disagreed philosophically on the details of how that support would be carried out. In particular, Bush sided with the board being composed of just scientists with no public insight. When Congress signed the legislation that created the NSF, many of Bush's ideals were removed. It illustrates that these questions about patent rights, social science expectations, the distribution of federal funding (geographical or merit), and who (scientists or policymakers) get to be the administrators are interesting questions that science policy grapples with.

== See also ==
- List of United States research and development agencies
- Science and technology in the United States
- Biomedical research in the United States
- Technological and industrial history of the United States
- Science policy
- Budget of NASA
- STAR METRICS
- List of books about the politics of science
