= List of R&D laboratories =

This is a list of R&D laboratories.

== Private research laboratories ==
Laboratory name	Company
Apple Industrial Design Group	Apple
AT&T Labs	AT&T
Bell-Northern Research	Bell Canada / Nortel
Bell Labs	Nokia
Boston Dynamics	Hyundai Motor Group
DEC Systems Research Center	Digital Equipment Corporation
DuPont Experimental Station	DuPont
IBM Research	IBM
Google AI	Google
Google Labs	Google
X Development	Google
Microsoft Research	Microsoft
Xerox PARC	Xerox
Amazon Lab126	Amazon
A9.com	Amazon
Samsung R&D Institute	Samsung
Reality Labs	Meta
Oracle Labs	Oracle Corporation
Southwest Research Institute	501(c)(3) nonprofit
SRI International	501(c)(3) nonprofit
Boeing Phantom Works	Boeing
Hewlett Packard Labs	Hewlett Packard Enterprise
Lufthansa Innovation Hub	Lufthansa
Skunk Works	Lockheed Martin
Walmart Labs	Walmart
VW Electronics Research Laboratory	Volkswagen

== University research laboratories ==
Laboratory Name	University
Broad Institute	MIT
Koch Institute for Integrative Cancer Research	MIT
Center for Biological and Computational Learning	MIT
Center for Bits and Atoms	MIT
Center for Theoretical Physics	MIT
Laboratory for Information and Decision Systems	MIT
MIT Lincoln Laboratory	MIT
MIT Media Lab	MIT
MIT Computer Science and AI Laboratory	MIT
Whitehead Institute	MIT
Arc Institute	Stanford
Center for Turbulence Research	Stanford
Hansen Experimental Physics Laboratory	Stanford
Kavli Institute for Particle Astrophysics and Cosmology	Stanford
Laboratory for Advanced Materials	Stanford
Stanford PULSE Institute	Stanford
SLAC National Accelerator Laboratory	Stanford
Stanford Intelligent Systems Laboratory	Stanford
Center for Human-Compatible Artificial Intelligence	Cal Berkeley
Space Sciences Laboratory	Cal Berkeley
Helen Wills Neuroscience Institute	Cal Berkeley
Innovative Genomics Institute	Cal Berkeley and UC San Francisco
Lawrence Berkeley National Laboratory	Cal Berkeley and DoE
Center for Energy Research	UCSD
La Jolla Institute for Immunology	UCSD
Salk Institute for Biological Studies	UCSD
San Diego Supercomputer Center	UCSD
Scripps Institution of Oceanography	UCSD
Scripps Research	UCSD
CyLab	Carnegie Mellon
Navlab	Carnegie Mellon
Robotics Institute	Carnegie Mellon
Software Engineering Institute	Carnegie Mellon
Usable Privacy and Security Laboratory	Carnegie Mellon
Pittsburgh Supercomputing Center	Carnegie Mellon / Pittsburgh University
Beckman Institute for Advanced Science & Technology	University of Illinois Urbana-Champaign
Institute for Condensed Matter Theory	University of Illinois Urbana-Champaign
National Center for Supercomputing Applications	University of Illinois Urbana-Champaign
Johns Hopkins Applied Physics Laboratory	Johns Hopkins University
Jet Propulsion Laboratory	Caltech / NASA
Caltech Seismological Laboratory	Caltech
Wyss Institute for Biologically Inspired Engineering	Harvard University
Harvard–Smithsonian Center for Astrophysics	Harvard University and Smithsonian Astrophysical Observatory
Plasmadynamics and Electric Propulsion Laboratory	Michigan
Life Sciences Institute	Michigan
Michigan Biotechnology Institute	Michigan State
Argonne National Laboratory	University of Chicago / Department of Energy
Enrico Fermi Institute	University of Chicago
Fermilab	University of Chicago / DoE / Universities Research Association
James Franck Institute	University of Chicago
Princeton Neuroscience Institute	Princeton University
Princeton Plasma Physics Laboratory	Princeton University
Princeton Sound Lab	Princeton University
Cornell University Center for Advanced Computing	Cornell University
Alternative Energy Institute	West Texas A&M
Center for Biofilm Engineering	Montana State University
Aquarius Reef Base	Florida International University / NOAA
National High Magnetic Field Laboratory	Florida State University / Florida / Los Alamos National Laboratory
National Radio Astronomy Observatory	Associated Universities, Inc.
International Institute of Tropical Forestry	University of Puerto Rico / United States Forest Service
Cavendish Laboratory	Cambridge
Centre for Theoretical Cosmology	Cambridge
MRC Laboratory of Molecular Biology	Cambridge / Medical Research Council
Chemistry Research Laboratory	Oxford
Weatherall Institute of Molecular Medicine	Oxford
Wellcome Centre for Human Genetics	Oxford
National Institute for Health and Care Research	Oxford / London / NHS / Department of Health and Social Care
ETH Laboratory of Ion Beam Physics	ETH Zurich
Idiap Research Institute	EPFL and University of Geneva

== Public research laboratories ==
Laboratory Name	Government Organization
Ames National Laboratory	United States Department of Energy
ARPA-E	United States Department of Energy
Oak Ridge National Laboratory	United States Department of Energy
Brookhaven National Laboratory	United States Department of Energy
SLAC National Accelerator Laboratory	United States Department of Energy
Office of Science	United States Department of Energy
Pacific Northwest National Laboratory	United States Department of Energy
Fermi National Accelerator Laboratory	United States Department of Energy
Idaho National Laboratory	United States Department of Energy
National Renewable Energy Laboratory	United States Department of Energy
Lawrence Livermore National Laboratory	United States Department of Energy
Los Alamos National Laboratory	United States Department of Energy
National Energy Technology Laboratory	United States Department of Energy
Sandia National Laboratories	United States Department of Energy
Savannah River National Laboratory	United States Department of Energy
Thomas Jefferson National Accelerator Facility	United States Department of Energy
Armstrong Flight Research Center	NASA
Glenn Research Center	NASA
Goddard Space Flight Center	NASA
Johnson Space Center	NASA
Langley Research Center	NASA
Marshall Space Flight Center	NASA
Ames Research Center	NASA
Space Radiation Laboratory	NASA
Stennis Space Center	NASA
Air Force Research Laboratory	United States Air Force
Air Force Systems Command	United States Air Force
Area 51	United States Air Force
Army Research Laboratory	United States Army
Army Combat Capabilities Development Command	United States Army
Army Medical Research and Development Command	United States Army
Engineer Research and Development Center	United States Army Corps of Engineers
United States Marine Corps Warfighting Laboratory	United States Marine Corps
Office of Naval Research	United States Navy
Naval Research Laboratory	United States Navy
United States Coast Guard Research & Development Center	United States Coast Guard
The Aerospace Corporation	United States Department of Defense
DARPA	United States Department of Defense
Center for Communications and Computing	Institute for Defense Analyses
National Biodefense Analysis and Countermeasures Center	Department of Homeland Security
National Cybersecurity FFRDC	Department of Homeland Security
DHS Science and Technology Directorate	Department of Homeland Security
Intelligence Advanced Research Projects Activity	Office of the Director of National Intelligence
Frederick National Laboratory for Cancer Research	National Cancer Institute
National Center for Atmospheric Research	University Corporation for Atmospheric Research
Marine Biological Laboratory	National Science Foundation
National Optical-Infrared Astronomy Research Laboratory	National Science Foundation
National Solar Observatory	National Science Foundation
National Institutes of Health	Department of Health and Human Services
Advanced Research Projects Agency for Health (ARPA-H)	Department of Health and Human Services
United States Geological Survey	Department of the Interior
National Institute of Justice	Department of Justice
Research and Innovative Technology Administration	United States Department of Transportation
Long-Term Pavement Performance	Federal Highway Administration
National Oceanic and Atmospheric Administration (NOAA)	United States Department of Commerce
Veterans Health Administration Office of Research and Development	Department of Veterans Affairs
Federal Judicial Center	Federal judiciary of the United States
Agricultural Research Service	United States Department of Agriculture
National Institute of Food and Agriculture	United States Department of Agriculture
Economic Research Service	United States Department of Agriculture
Forest Products Laboratory	United States Forest Service
Electronics and Telecommunications Research Institute	Daedeok Science Town (South Korea)
Central Mechanical Engineering Research Institute	Council of Scientific and Industrial Research (India)
Max Planck Institute for Intelligent Systems	Max Planck Society (Germany)
Vector Institute	Canadian Institute for Advanced Research
National Institute for Materials Science	National Research and Development Agency (Japan)
RIKEN	National Research and Development Agency (Japan)
National Institute of Advanced Industrial Science and Technology	National Research and Development Agency (Japan)
Japan Aerospace Exploration Agency	National Research and Development Agency (Japan)
National Institute of Genetics	National Research and Development Agency (Japan)
National Institute for Basic Biology	National Research and Development Agency (Japan)
National Institute of Informatics	National Research and Development Agency (Japan)
National Cancer Center	National Research and Development Agency (Japan)
National Institute of Information and Communications Technology	National Research and Development Agency (Japan)
National Institute of Infectious Diseases	National Research and Development Agency (Japan)
European Space Research Organisation	European Space Agency
Central Laser Facility	Rutherford Appleton Laboratory
Diamond Light Source	Rutherford Appleton Laboratory
ISIS Neutron and Muon Source	Rutherford Appleton Laboratory
CERN	Science and Technology Facilities Council
DiRAC	Science and Technology Facilities Council
European Synchrotron Radiation Facility	Science and Technology Facilities Council
Institut Laue-Langevin	Science and Technology Facilities Council
UK Astronomy Technology Centre	Science and Technology Facilities Council
Hartree Centre	Science and Technology Facilities Council
ALICE, EMMA, CLARA	Daresbury Laboratory
Worldwide LHC Computing Grid	GridPP
Boulby Mine underground laboratory	Science and Technology Facilities Council
Laser Interferometer Gravitational-Wave Observatory	NSF / STFC

== See also ==
- United States Department of Energy National Laboratories
- List of United States federal research and development agencies
- Federally funded research and development centers
- Apple Advanced Technology Group – discontinued in 1997
- Intel Architecture Labs – discontinued in the 2000s
- NASA facilities
- Intel Research Lablets
- Engineering Research Centers
- Networking and Information Technology Research and Development
- National Nanotechnology Initiative
- National Research and Development Agency (Japan)
- List of research stations in the Arctic
- List of university artificial intelligence research centers
- List of software developed at universities
- Research stations in Antarctica
- UK Research and Innovation
- CERN openlab
- List of robotics companies
- List of robotics laboratories
- List of United States college laboratories conducting basic defense research
- Research_institute#Notable_research_centres
