= List of robotics laboratories =

This is a list of robotics laboratories and robotics research organizations. It includes research centers, institutes, academic departments, and research laboratories that do substantial work in robotics, autonomous systems, robot perception, computer vision, robot control, robot learning, human–robot interaction, service robotics, medical robotics, robot competitions, or related areas.

== Notable examples by country ==
=== Argentina ===
- Instituto de Automática

=== Australia ===
- Australian Centre for Field Robotics
- Australian Centre for Robotic Vision
- Fugro SpAARC

=== China ===
- Institute of Automation, Chinese Academy of Sciences
- Shenyang Institute of Automation

=== Czech Republic ===
- Czech Institute of Informatics, Robotics and Cybernetics

=== France ===
- LIRMM

=== Germany ===
- Center for Telematics

=== India ===
- Centre for Artificial Intelligence and Robotics
- IISc Guidance, Control and Decision Systems Laboratory
- Surface Robotics Laboratory-CMERI

=== Italy ===
- Istituto Italiano di Tecnologia
- VisLab

=== Netherlands ===
- RoboValley

=== South Korea ===
- Robot research initiative

=== Spain ===
- CETpD
- Institut de Robòtica i Informàtica Industrial

=== Switzerland ===
- Institute of Robotics and Intelligent Systems

=== United Arab Emirates ===
- Interactive Robots and Media Lab
- Technology Innovation Institute

=== United Kingdom ===
- Bristol Robotics Laboratory
- National Centre for Nuclear Robotics
- Oxford Robotics Institute
- Remote Applications in Challenging Environments

=== United States ===
- Advanced Robotics for Manufacturing
- Berkeley Robotics and Human Engineering Laboratory
- Carnegie Mellon Robotics Institute
- Florida Institute for Human and Machine Cognition
- Georgia Tech Institute for Robotics and Intelligent Machines
- Intelligent Robotics Group
- MIT CSAIL
- National Robotics Engineering Center
- University of Michigan Department of Robotics

== See also ==
- Laboratory automation
- Laboratory robotics
- List of open-source hardware for robotics
- List of open-source robotics software
- List of robotics companies
- List of robotics occupations
- List of robotics software
- List of R&D laboratories
- List of university artificial intelligence research centers
- Physical artificial intelligence
