= University of Michigan Department of Robotics =

Academic department at the University of Michigan

- Michigan Robotics
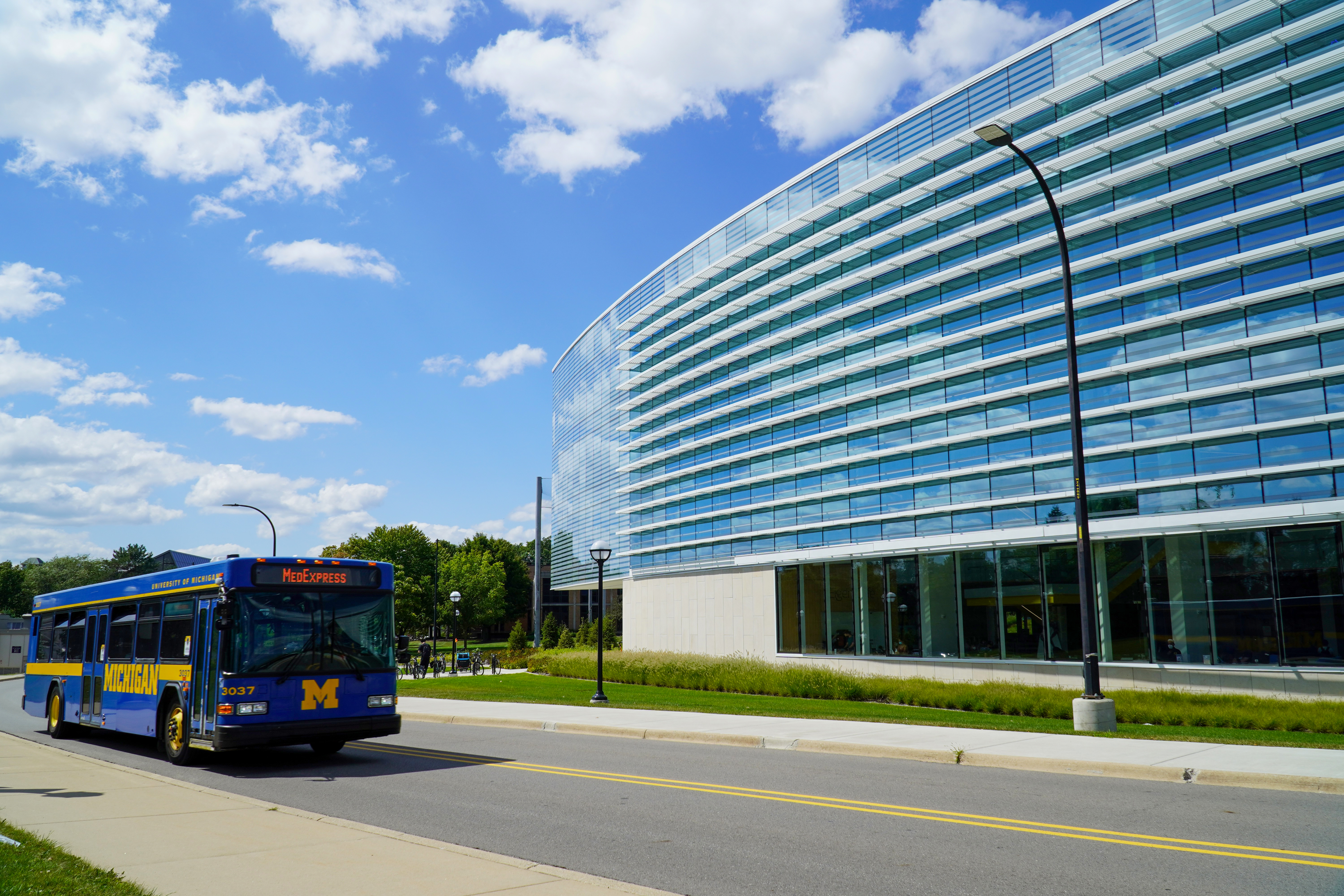
- The Ford Motor Company Robotics Building on the University of Michigan's North Campus
- Type: Academic department
- Established: 2022
- Parent institution: University of Michigan College of Engineering
- Department Chair: Dawn Tilbury
- Location: Ann Arbor, Michigan, United States
- Website: robotics.umich.edu

The University of Michigan Department of Robotics is an academic department within the University of Michigan College of Engineering in Ann Arbor, Michigan. Approved by the University of Michigan Board of Regents on December 9, 2021, and operational in 2022, it was the first dedicated robotics department created among the nation's top-ten-ranked engineering schools. The department is housed in the Ford Motor Company Robotics Building on the university's North Campus.

== History ==
=== Graduate program and Robotics Institute (2014–2021) ===
Robotics research at the University of Michigan has drawn on faculty from multiple departments across the College of Engineering. In 2012, a committee chaired by Dawn Tilbury recommended the creation of a graduate program in robotics, an interdisciplinary institute, and shared research space. A graduate program in robotics offering both Master of Science and Doctor of Philosophy degrees admitted its first students in the fall of 2014. The Michigan Robotics Institute was formally established in 2018 to coordinate robotics research and education across campus. By 2021, annual applications to the graduate program exceeded 1,000, and 158 students were enrolled (87 M.S. and 71 Ph.D.). The Robotics Institute was directed by Jessy Grizzle, the Elmer G. Gilbert Distinguished University Professor of Engineering.

Over the five years preceding the department's creation, robotics faculty research expenditures nearly tripled, growing from $5.6 million to $16.0 million.

In March 2021, the university and Ford Motor Company opened the Ford Motor Company Robotics Building, a four-story, 134,000 square feet (12,400 m^{2}) complex on the university's North Campus. The building was designed by the architecture firm HED and cost approximately $75 million. The first three floors house university research laboratories, classrooms, and makerspaces, while the fourth floor contained Ford's first robotics and mobility research laboratory on a university campus, accommodating approximately 100 Ford researchers and engineers. Specialized facilities within the building include the Ronald D. and Regina C. McNeil Walking Robotics Laboratory, a three-story indoor fly zone for testing aerial vehicles, a rehabilitation laboratory, and a Mars yard for rover and lander prototyping.

=== Department of Robotics (2022–present) ===
On December 9, 2021, the University of Michigan Board of Regents approved the establishment of the Department of Robotics within the College of Engineering. The proposal had received unanimous support from the College of Engineering Executive Committee and an affirmative vote of the college's governing faculty. The new department was formed from the existing Robotics Institute, which at the time comprised 27 core faculty members spanning 12 departments and 42 affiliate faculty drawn from fields including architecture and anthropology. The department was created with the aim of formalizing robotics as a distinct academic discipline, separate from established fields such as mechanical engineering and computer science.

The department launched its undergraduate program in the fall of 2022, after receiving approval from the Michigan Association of State Universities. Market research conducted during the department's planning had indicated that approximately 40 percent of College of Engineering undergraduates expressed interest in a robotics major or minor, and 25 percent of admitted students who enrolled elsewhere indicated that a robotics degree might have changed their decision. Pilot undergraduate courses had been offered beginning in 2020, covering topics such as computational linear algebra, robotic mechanisms, and introductory programming and artificial intelligence.

Dawn Tilbury, a professor of mechanical engineering and control theorist, serves as the department chair.

== Academics ==
The department offers a Bachelor of Science in Engineering (BSE) degree in robotics, as well as Master of Science and Doctor of Philosophy degrees. The graduate programs are organized around three core technical areas: sensing, reasoning, and acting.

The department has collaborated with Morehouse College and Spelman College on remotely accessible robotics courses, and has made course materials available online as open-source educational resources.

== Research ==
The department's research spans several focus areas, including autonomous vehicles, human-robot interaction, legged locomotion, manipulation, manufacturing, perception, and rehabilitation robotics.

Notable research projects and contributions from faculty associated with the department include work on the MABEL bipedal walking robot, which in 2011 was reported as the fastest two-legged robot with knees, reaching a peak speed of 6.8 miles per hour (10.9 km/h); the Open Source Leg project, an open-access robotic knee–ankle prosthesis platform led by Elliott J. Rouse and published in Nature Biomedical Engineering; and the Mcity Test Facility, a proving ground for autonomous vehicle testing located on the university campus.

Algorithms developed by department-affiliated researchers for bipedal robot control have been adapted by others for use in powered prosthetic limbs and exoskeletons.

== Facilities ==
In addition to the Ford Motor Company Robotics Building, the department has access to several other university facilities relevant to robotics research:

- M-Air Net – A 10,000-square-foot (930 m^{2}) four-story netted outdoor facility for studying autonomous and collaborative aerial robotics in variable weather conditions.
- Mcity – A 32-acre (13 ha) proving ground for testing connected and automated vehicles, opened in 2015.
- Aaron Friedman Marine Hydrodynamics Laboratory – A facility containing a 360-foot (110 m) indoor body of water for testing robotic and conventional watercraft.

== Organization ==
The department is governed by an executive committee. As of 2025, its members include Dawn Tilbury (department chair), Mark Draelos, Jessy Grizzle, Dimitra Panagou, Elliott J. Rouse, Leia Stirling (associate director of undergraduate studies), and Ram Vasudevan (associate director of graduate studies).

== See also ==
- University of Michigan College of Engineering
- Robotics Institute (Carnegie Mellon University)
- MIT Computer Science and Artificial Intelligence Laboratory
- Georgia Institute of Technology Institute for Robotics and Intelligent Machines
