= List of United States federal research and development agencies =

This is a list of United States federal agencies that are primarily devoted to research and development, including their notable subdivisions. These agencies are responsible for carrying out the science policy of the United States.

== Independent agencies ==
- National Science Foundation (NSF)
- National Aeronautics and Space Administration (NASA)
- Environmental Protection Agency Office of Research and Development
- Intelligence Advanced Research Projects Activity (IARPA)
- Smithsonian Institution research centers and programs

== Department of Agriculture ==
- Agricultural Research Service (ARS)
- National Institute of Food and Agriculture (NIFA)
- Economic Research Service (ERS)
- United States Forest Service Research and Development (R&D)

== Department of Commerce ==
- National Institute of Standards and Technology (NIST)
- National Oceanic and Atmospheric Administration (NOAA)

== Department of Defense ==
- Defense Advanced Research Projects Agency (DARPA)
- Uniformed Services University of the Health Sciences (USU)

=== Department of the Air Force ===
- Air Force Research Laboratory (AFRL)
- Air Force Life Cycle Management Center (AFLCMC)
- Air Force Nuclear Weapons Center (NWC)
- Air Force Institute of Technology (AFIT)
- Space Systems Command (SSC)

=== Department of the Army ===
- U.S. Army Materiel Command (AMC)
  - Aviation and Missile Command (AMCOM)
  - Communications-Electronics Command (CECOM)
  - Tank-automotive and Armaments Command (TACOM)
- U.S. Army Futures Command (AFC)
  - Combat Capabilities Development Command (DEVCOM)
    - Armaments Center (DEVCOM AC)
    - Army Research Laboratory (ARL or DEVCOM ARL)
      - Army Research Office (ARO)
- U.S. Army Medical Research and Development Command (USAMRDC)
- Engineer Research and Development Center (ERDC)
- U.S. Army Test and Evaluation Command (ATEC)

=== Department of the Navy ===
- Marine Corps Combat Development Command (MCCDC)
  - Marine Corps Warfighting Laboratory (MCWL)
- Office of Naval Research (ONR)
- Naval Research Laboratory (NRL)
- Bureau of Medicine and Surgery (BUMED)
  - Naval Medical Research Center (NMRC)
- Naval Air Warfare Center (NASC)
- Naval Surface Warfare Center (NSWC)
- Naval Undersea Warfare Center (NUWC)
- Naval Command, Control and Ocean Surveillance Warfare Center (NCCOSC)
- Naval Postgraduate School (NPS)
- Naval Air Weapons Station China Lake (NAWSCL)
- United States Naval Observatory (USNO)

== Department of Education ==
- Institute of Education Sciences (IES)
- National Institute on Disability and Rehabilitation Research (NIDRR)

== Department of Energy ==
- Office of Science (DOE SC)
- Advanced Research Projects Agency-Energy (ARPA-E)
- National Laboratories

== Department of Health and Human Services ==
- National Institutes of Health (NIH)
- National Institute for Occupational Safety and Health (NIOSH)
- Food and Drug Administration science and research programs
- Agency for Healthcare Research and Quality (AHRQ)
- Biomedical Advanced Research and Development Authority (BARDA)
- Advanced Research Projects Agency for Health (ARPA-H)

== Department of Homeland Security ==
- Directorate for Science and Technology (S&T)
- Coast Guard Research & Development Center (CG RDC)

== Department of the Interior ==
- United States Geological Survey (USGS)

== Department of Justice ==
- National Institute of Justice (NIJ)

== Department of Transportation ==
- Research and Innovative Technology Administration
- Federal Aviation Administration Research, Engineering, and Development
- Federal Highway Administration Research and Technology

== Environmental Protection Agency ==
- Air Research
- Water Research
- Climate Change Research
- Ecosystems Research
- Land, Oil Spill, and Waste Management Research
- Homeland Security Research

== Veterans Affairs ==
- Veterans Health Administration Office of Research and Development (ORD)

== Multi-agency initiatives ==
- Office of Science and Technology Policy (OSTP)
- U.S. Global Change Research Program (USGCRP)
- Networking and Information Technology Research and Development Program (NITRD)
- National Nanotechnology Initiative (NNI)

== Judicial branch ==
- Federal Judicial Center

== Legislative branch ==
- House Committee on Science, Space and Technology
- Senate Committee on Commerce, Science, and Transportation
- Office of Technology Assessment (OTA) (defunct)

== See also ==
- List of R&D laboratories
