= List of university artificial intelligence research centers =

Research centers focusing on AI and related fields

This is a list of university-affiliated research centers, institutes, and laboratories focused on artificial intelligence (AI), including machine learning, computer vision, natural language processing, robotics, and related fields.

== Australia ==
- Australian Artificial Intelligence Institute – University of Technology Sydney

== Bulgaria ==
- Institute for Computer Science, Artificial Intelligence and Technology – Sofia University

== Canada ==
- Centre for AI Decision-making and Action (CAIDA) – University of British Columbia
- Centre for Intelligent Machines – McGill University
- Centre for Analytics and Artificial Intelligence Engineering (CARTE) – University of Toronto
- Schwartz Reisman Institute – University of Toronto
- Temerty Centre for Artificial Intelligence Research and Education in Medicine (T-CAIREM) – University of Toronto
- Waterloo Data and Artificial Intelligence Institute (Waterloo.AI) – University of Waterloo

== China ==
- Artificial Intelligence Institute – Shanghai Jiao Tong University
- Institute for AI Industry Research (AIR) – Tsinghua University
- Institute for Artificial Intelligence – Peking University
- Institute of Artificial Intelligence – Zhejiang University

== Germany ==
- Munich Center for Machine Learning – joint research initiative of LMU Munich and Technical University of Munich

== Greece ==
- Humanistic and Social Informatics Laboratory (HILab) – research laboratory of the Department of Informatics, Ionian University, focusing on Humanistic and Social Informatics, Computational Linguistics, Cultural Informatics, Multimedia, Virtual Reality, Semantic Web technologies, and Artificial Intelligence research.

== Hong Kong ==
- Centre for Artificial Intelligence Research (CAiRE) – Hong Kong University of Science and Technology

== Singapore ==
- Centre of AI-for-X (AI.X) – Nanyang Technological University
- NUS Artificial Intelligence Institute – National University of Singapore

== South Africa ==
- Wits MIND Institute – University of the Witwatersrand

== South Korea ==
- Kim Jaechul Graduate School of AI – KAIST

== Spain ==
- AI Research Institute (IIIA-CSIC) - Autonomous University of Barcelona.

== Switzerland ==
- Dalle Molle Institute for Artificial Intelligence Research – joint institute of the Università della Svizzera italiana and SUPSI
- ETH AI Center – ETH Zurich

== United Kingdom ==
- Artificial Intelligence Applications Institute – University of Edinburgh
- Human-Centered AI Lab – University of Oxford
- Leverhulme Centre for the Future of Intelligence – University of Cambridge
- Oxford-UBS Centre for Applied Artificial Intelligence – University of Oxford
- UCL Centre for Artificial Intelligence – University College London

== United States ==
- AI Institute in Dynamic Systems – Washington
- Amazon-Illinois Center on AI for Interactive Conversational Experiences (AICE) – Illinois
- Berkeley Artificial Intelligence Research (BAIR) – UC Berkeley
- Center for AI in Biomedicine (CAIB) – UC San Diego
- Center for Artificial Intelligence in Society – USC
- Center for Artificial Intelligence Innovation (CAII) – Illinois
- Center for Machine Learning – Maryland
- Columbia Center of Artificial Intelligence Technology (CAIT) – Columbia
- Florida Institute for Human and Machine Cognition – Florida University System
- Institute for Creative Technologies – USC
- Kempner Institute for the Study of Natural and Artificial Intelligence – Harvard
- Malachowsky Hall for Data Science & Information Technology – Florida
- Machine Learning Center (ML@GT) – Georgia Tech
- Michigan AI Laboratory – Michigan
- MIT Center for Collective Intelligence – MIT
- MIT Computer Science and Artificial Intelligence Laboratory (CSAIL) – MIT
- Robotics Institute – Carnegie Mellon
- Sky Computing Lab – UC Berkeley
- SNU-CMU Human-Centered AI Research Center – Carnegie Mellon and SNU
- Stanford Artificial Intelligence Laboratory (SAIL) – Stanford
- Stanford Institute for Human-Centered Artificial Intelligence (HAI) – Stanford
- Stanford Intelligent Systems Laboratory – Stanford
- Syracuse University - Institute for Artificial Intelligence
- Tech AI – Georgia Tech
- UF Artificial Intelligence and Informatics Research Institute (AIIRI) – Florida
- USC Information Sciences Institute – USC

== University-developed AI frameworks and systems ==
- Caffe (software) – deep learning framework for computer vision applications (UC Berkeley)
- SGLang – framework for structured generation and serving large language models (UC Berkeley, Stanford, Carnegie Mellon)
- Theano (software) – numerical computation library used in deep learning research (Université de Montréal)
- Torch – machine learning and scientific computing framework developed at the Idiap Research Institute in Switzerland
- vLLM – inference and serving framework for large language models (UC Berkeley)
- Weka (machine learning) – machine learning software for data mining (University of Waikato)

== See also ==
- List of artificial intelligence algorithms
- List of artificial intelligence companies
- List of artificial intelligence institutions
- List of artificial intelligence projects
- Lists of open-source artificial intelligence software
- List of robotics laboratories
- List of software developed at universities
- List of the top supercomputers in the United States
- Chinese Academy of Sciences
- Comparison of deep learning software
- Comparison of machine learning software
- AlphaDev and AlphaEvolve — AI systems by Google DeepMind for discovering and optimizing computer science algorithms
