= National Research and Development Agency =

National Research and Development Agency may refer to one of the following organizations:

- National Research and Development Agency (Chile)
- National Research and Development Agency (Japan)

== See also ==
- National Research and Innovation Agency, Indonesia
