= SSPS =

SSPS or SSpS or 'ssps' may refer to:

- Satellite Systems and Procedures
- Missionary Sisters Servants of the Holy Spirit
- Smichov secondary technical school
- Stuart Scott Public School
- Shared Socioeconomic Pathways (SSPs)
- Sheffield Sawmakers' Protection Society, a former trade union in England
- Single Sound Per Symbol, a phonetic alphabet
