= Vladimír Mařík =

Czech academic

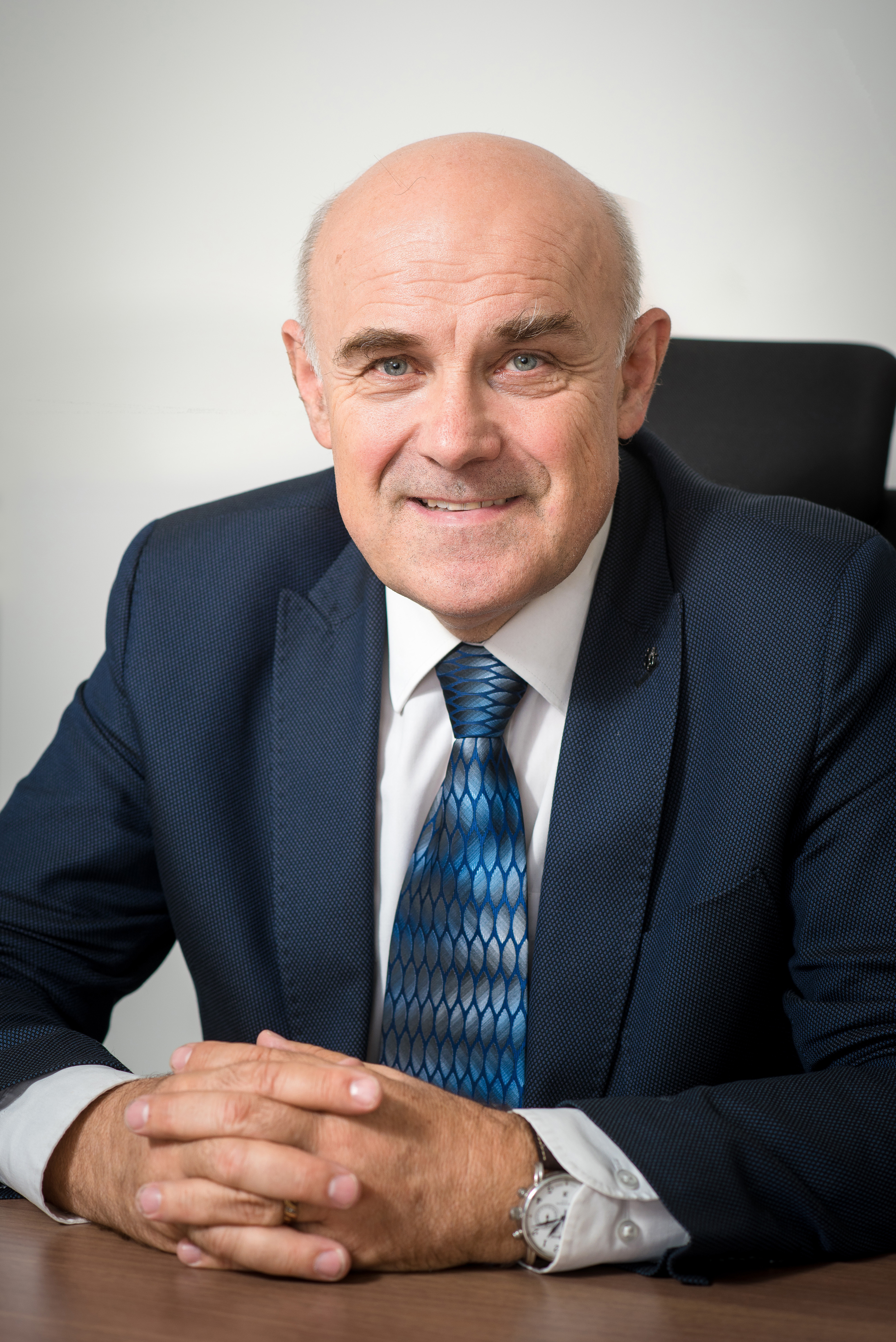
- Mařík in 2016
- Born: 1952 (age 73–74); Praha
- Education: Czech Technical University in Prague
- Awards: Czechoslovak State Prize, 1989; Rockwell´s Chairman Team Award, 1997; Austrian “Honorary Cross for Science and Art“ (by the President of the Austrian Republic), 2003; Czech Mind award, 2010
- Scientific career
- Fields: Technical Cybernetics
- Workplaces: Czech Technical University in Prague; Czech Institute of Informatics, Robotics and Cybernetics (CIIRC)

Vladimír Mařík is a Czech scientist.

== Education ==
Mařík received his M.Sc. and Ph.D. degrees in Control Engineering at the Czech Technical University in Prague in 1975 and 1979, respectively.

== Career ==
Mařík was appointed Full Professor at the Czech Technical University in 1990. He acted as the head of the Department of Cybernetics, Czech Technical University since 1999 when he established the department until 2013.

He became a founder of the Czech Institute of Informatics, Robotics and Cybernetics (CIIRC) at CTU in 2013. He was CIIRC Director from 2013 to 2018.

Mařík acted as the founder of the Rockwell Automation Research Center Prague, as a part of the Advanced Technology organization of the Rockwell Automation Inc., Milwaukee, Wisconsin, and was appointed the managing director of this Center in 1992. He left this role in 2009. Mařík took over the chairman of the Board position of CertiCon in January 2010. He was one of the founders of this company in 1996. This company has got 350 engineers and researchers providing high-tech solutions in the fields of SW and HW development and testing.

Mařík's professional interests include artificial intelligence, multi-agent and knowledge-based systems, soft-computing, production planning and scheduling applications. He has contributed to the basic science in the area of uncertainty processing in expert systems, in the agent-based system architectures and languages as well as in deployment of ontological knowledge in agent-based control systems. He was strongly involved in development of many industrial solutions, e.g. for Rockwell Automation, Airbus Industries, Bosch, Denso, Medtronic, etc.

Mařík acted as a member of the Council of the Engineering Academy of the Czech Republic (2005–2010) and was elected a foreign member of the Russian Engineering Academy in 2009. He is an Honorary Member of the Austrian Society for Artificial Intelligence (2003). He was appointed the Chairman of the Research Board of the Technology Agency of the Czech Republic in 2010. He acted as a member of the R&D&I Council of the Czech Republic in 2011–2015.

== Publications ==
Mařík is the author or co-author of more than 170 journal and conference papers, co-author or editor of 17 books (Springer Verlag, Kluwer Academic), co-author of 5 US patents. He acted as the Editor-in-Chief of the IEEE Trans. System, Man and Cybernetics, part C in 2005–2013. He is a member of the editorial board of the Czech mutation of the Scientific American magazine.

In 2006, Mařík became a co-founder of the Czech Technical University Media Laboratory – Foundation established to support research carried out by students and young researchers. He has been acting as the chairman of the Board of this Foundation since the very beginning.

== Awards and honors ==
Mařík was awarded with the Czechoslovak State Prize in 1989, with the Rockwell's Chairman Team Award in 1997, with the Austrian “Honorary Cross for Science and Art“ (by the President of the Austrian Republic) in 2003, and with “Czech Mind” award in 2010. He received the “Outstanding Service Award” by IEEE SMC Society in 2012 and the “ABB Lifetime Contribution to Factory Automation Award” by the IEEE IES Society in 2016. He was awarded by the Doctor Honoris Causa at the Brno University of Technology in 2013.
