= National University of San Juan =

Coordinates: 31°32′27″S 68°34′40″W

- Universidad Nacional de San Juan
- Motto: Education for the Future, Dinamic Education
- Type: Public
- Established: 1973
- Rector: Mag. Ing. Tadeo Berenguer
- Academic staff: 4,859
- Students: 15,509
- Location: San Juan, Argentina
- Campus: Urban Suburban
- Website: http://www.unsj.edu.ar

The National University of San Juan (in Castilian, Universidad Nacional de San Juan, UNSJ) is a public university in Argentina. Its seat is located in the city of San Juan, capital of the province of the same name, in the Cuyo region. It was founded in 1973, based on several local institutions and a faculty of the National University of Cuyo.

== Institutions ==
The National University of San Juan includes the following faculties:

- Engineering
- Philosophy, Humanities and Arts
- Architecture, Urbanization and Design
- Social Sciences
- Exact, Physical and Natural Sciences

These provide a wide array of titles, including tecnicaturas (intermediate), licenciaturas (Bachelor's degrees), professorships, and post-graduate courses.

Research activity is conducted through the postgraduate departments of each faculty. Moreover, The University has 14 Research Institutes in which primary research activities are conducted.

== History ==
The origin of UNSJ was a Preparatory College founded in 1839 by then-governor (then president of Argentina) Domingo Faustino Sarmiento. The faculty of Mineralogy of this college gave rise to the technical School of Mines, which in turn fathered other teaching institutions. In 1939 the National University of Cuyo (UNCuyo) was founded with its seat in Mendoza, and San Juan Province was included in its area of influence; UNCuyo's Faculty of Engineering started functioning in San Juan in 1947. Also in that year, courses to form professors in Sciences and Letters began at the Sarmiento Normal School. These courses were split from the school, to be dictated at the newly created National Institute of the Secondary School Professorship, in 1958.

During the 1960s, the society of San Juan Province strived to achieve the creation of a national university. In 1968 a programme to create new state universities did not include San Juan, but renewed demands led to a feasibility study.

The National University of San Juan was created by Law 20367, signed by de facto President Alejandro Agustín Lanusse, on 10 May 1973. It grew to integrate the National Institute of the Secondary School Professorship, the Faculty of Engineering, Exact, Physical and Natural Sciences formerly dependent on the National University of Cuyo, and the Domingo F. Sarmiento Provincial University. The full fusion of these institutions was completed on 10 October.

== See also ==
- Science and Education in Argentina
- Argentine Higher Education Official Site
- Argentine Universities
- Automation Institute
