= Smichov Secondary Technical School =

- Smíchovská střední průmyslová škola, gymnázium a hotelová škola Radlická, příspěvková organizace

Location
- Preslova 72/25, Praha 5 – Smíchov, 150 21; Prague; Czech Republic
- 50.0753678°N 14.4050708°E

Information
- Other names: SSPŠ
- Type: Public
- Motto: Nebojíme se budoucnosti, tvoříme ji. (We don't fear the future. We create it.)
- Established: 1901
- Founder: Capital City of Prague
- Principal: Ing. Radko Sáblík
- Age range: 15–19
- Enrollment: 645
- Classes offered: Information Technology Cyber Security Gymnasium
- Newspaper: Presloviny
- Tuition: No tuition fees

Smichov Secondary Technical School (Czech: Smíchovská střední průmyslová škola, gymnázium a hotelová škola Radlická, příspěvková organizace, SSPŠ) is a secondary school based in the capital city of the Czech Republic Prague, Smíchov. It was founded in 1901 and now has over 600 students in 20 classes. Currently, the courses of Information technology, Cyber Security and Gymnasium are taught here. Students specialize in various sub-disciplines such as application development, virtual and augmented reality, Cyber Security, Multimedia, Internet of things, Robotics and Web applications.

== History ==
SSPS was founded in 1901 by the city of Smichov which elected Ing. Emanuel Hertik as the first principal. Few years later, World War I struck the school as it was used for war purposes and in 1915 the school had department for war invalids.

The school experienced prosperity during the First Czechoslovak Republic. In said period automobile construction course was opened and optical and mechanical departments were created.

SSPS was also affected by World War II. Ferdinand Blavic, the school's principal was executed and many student's were forcibly taken to work in German companies such as Friesecke&Höppfner.

In the nineties, SSPS was equipped with computational hardware for the first time and it even started to offer study programmes which ended with Matura.

== Currently ==
Smichov Secondary Technical School offers three fields of education – Information technology, one class of Technical Lyceum class and one Cyber Security class in pilot mode. In the school year 2019/2020, SSPŠ educates 644 students, the school is 99% full. Most students applied to the field of Information Technology, while the smallest double overhang was recorded in the Technical Lyceum field. Overall, SSPŠ had the most applications from all Prague secondary schools offering four-year graduation courses. According to Forbes magazine, the school was ranked among the eight most interesting Secondary schools in the Czech Republic in February 2018.

Modern laboratories such as Physics Laboratory, Cybernetic Polygon, Virtual and Augmented Reality Laboratory, IoT Laboratory, Robotics Laboratory or Polytechnic Nest Classroom have been built at the school. At the same time, large-scale school projects, such as the Studio 301 and Preslova Media House, are being developed, involving dozens of students. Unique virtual tours of Auschwitz I and Auschwitz II concentration camps are created or the Terezín fortress from 1800 in Studio 301.

Since 2019, there has been a change in teaching in the field of Information Technology, where after the second year students can choose a school leaving examination (specialization), a second course specialized, a seminar and a topic of a student project in which all students have been creating since 2014 year-round work in the third year. Students can thus choose the subjects and the theme of their year-round work to adapt their teaching to the level of their talent and interest, which is subsequently identified by the Czech School Inspectorate as another strength of the school and as a correct achievement. Since 2019, the courses Presentation Skills, Entrepreneurship Education and IT in Practice have also been introduced. The appreciation of the activities and the introduction of new elements into school management can be taken as the head of the school, Radko Sáblík, was invited by Minister of Education in January 2019 to an eight-member expert team who is involved in creating a new vision of Czech education – the Strategy 2030+. In addition, students and graduates from Preslova Media House collaborate with the Ministry of Education to promote this vision.

SSPŠ is sought out by students mainly for many activities in which students can engage beyond the classroom, for the high involvement of students and graduates in school operation, for the creation of Student and Graduation projects or for the creation of Startups directly at school. Also for teaching the most modern areas of IT, such as cyber security, which the school began to teach as the first high school in the Czech Republic, Internet of Things, Virtual and Augmented Reality, Robotics. The Smíchov Secondary School is unique in Czech secondary education in how many and to what extent students and graduates are involved in school operation. However, the school does not close itself, it organizes Workshops for primary school pupils and seniors, it trains Czech and European teachers within the framework of the ITEC SSPŠ project, where lecturers are both classical teachers and, above all, graduates and students.

== Specialized workplaces ==
=== Cybernetic polygon ===
In 2017, a special polygon, a space with computers behind mobile walls, where Cyber Security is taught, was created in preparation for the newly taught Cyber Security course. The Authors are two former students of the school David Sýkora and Nathan Němec, now Teachers.

=== VR Laboratory ===
Since 2018, a virtual reality laboratory has been in the school. It is called Studio 301, which is derived from the classroom number in which the Virtual and Augmented Reality Laboratory is located. The laboratory of virtual and augmented reality was built by graduate and teacher Igor Žmajlo, it was established even before it was set up at the Czech Institute of Informatics, Robotics and Cybernetics at ČVUT. With its 18 stationary and 5 portable workplaces, it was the largest in Central Europe at the time of its establishment.

Within Studio 301, students work on many projects, whether school or personal ones, they create virtual tours of various locations or create computer games. However, there are also seminars in the laboratory; In them, the candidates, especially from lower grades, get acquainted with modeling and programming for creating specific applications. Members of Studio 301 are also involved in the education of teachers, both Czech and foreign.

=== IoT Laboratory ===
IoT Laboratory in SSPŠ is one of the first Internet of Things laboratories in the Czech Republic. The new laboratory, under the leadership of Jan Tesař, enables computer control of lighting, ventilation and other wiring with the help of sensors. The laboratory was established thanks to a grant from the municipality. The partner of the IoT project is the City Center of the Future of the Czech Institute of Informatics, Robotics and Cybernetics at ČVUT.

=== Preslova Media House ===
Since spring 2019, the Preslova Media House has been working with the Ministry of Education, Youth and Sports to promote the creation of a vision of the Czech education system called Strategy 2030+. As part of this, reports from some events, interviews with personalities were filmed. In November 2019 Preslova Media House organized a conference on Strategy 2030+, which took place in the New Town Hall in Prague.

This project is open, not only all employees, graduates and students of SSPŠ, but also other Prague and non-Prague secondary schools and individuals can participate. Negotiations are ongoing with various organizations. The intention is to create a Media House, in which the reports will consist exclusively of high school students, who will primarily focus on Czech education, but also the use and possible misuse of modern technologies and social issues.

The intention is also to organize regular debates on the Czech education system in the new Media Studio, inviting not only personalities from this field, academics, Politicians, but also teachers and students. The main goal is to communicate their views to the public.

== Other school activities ==
Beyond regular education, the school provides a wide range of Certifications, whether in the field of computer networks from Cisco CCNA, the Office Microsoft Office Specialist, or the Autodesk Inventor design system. There is also a "Young Audience Club" at the school, which arranges visits to theatrical performances at Prague theaters for a bargain price.

=== Student Club ===
The school has a student club where students on high-performance computers can work on a variety of projects in professional development and graphics software. There is also a games room with a game console with various game titles. The Student Club also includes a study room which is separated from the rest of the club.

=== Student laboratory ===
The Student Laboratory was established by Petr Štěpánek, a student of Smíchov Secondary School, who still runs the laboratory in 2017. Students can meet here and research their projects, they can work on them, but they can also meet their colleagues from all over the Czech Republic. Students can also collaborate on Startups.

=== Audiovisual studio ===
The audiovisual studio has been in operation since October 2008. The studio is often modernized and provides students with a high-quality background for increasingly demanding audiovisual experiments. In the later afternoon and evening, students use the music rehearsal room. There is an equipment for musicians, a drum kit etc. The audio video studio premises are also used by students who create Internet news about the school.

=== Students and girls' association ===
There are also two clubs in the school. Student Association of SSPŠ, which develops further education of students by various Lectures and workshops. The Girls' Association of SSPŠ supports girls in the technical fields of study in the form of a Peer Program. The association organizes events for further education and knowledge in the fields, such as visiting a company or other organization, a trip abroad or participating in a public events.

== External sources ==
- Official Website
- School Textbook Website
- Girls' Association Website
- Newspaper Presloviny Website
