= Debasish Ghose =

Indian professor

Debasish Ghose (born 16 May 1960) is a professor at Department of Aerospace Engineering, Indian Institute of Science. He is believed to have initiated work on cooperative control in India, having pioneered research on Intelligent control and multi-agents. He founded the first mobile robotics lab in India i.e. Mobile Robotics Laboratory at IISc in 2002. He is known for his early work in swarm intelligence, distributed computing and game theory. His primary research is in Guidance and control of autonomous vehicles, although, current interest is in Computational intelligence i.e. Machine Learning for Aerial Robotics.

Formerly, he has served as chair of the Department of Aerospace, IISc (2012–15) and convener of the Space Technology Cell (STC), ISRO-IISc.

He was a visiting professor at the University of California, Los Angeles for nearly 4 years.

== Education ==
- 1990 Doctor of Philosophy (PhD in Electrical Engineering), Indian Institute of Science. His specialization is in applied maths (game theory).
- 1984 Masters in Electrical Engineering, Indian Institute of Science
- 1982 BSc (Engg), Electrical Engineering, National Institute of Technology, Rourkela

== Academic research ==
Ghose's research is in the field of intelligent-control and swarms of autonomous systems. He has been working in dynamic game theory, distributed computing, swarm intelligence, multi-agent systems and robotics. The research group has close collaborations with eminent researchers and academic departments in countries such as the US, Israel, UK, Singapore, South Korea, Germany, Japan.

He has served in the editorial boards of prestigious international journals and conferences (e.g. IEEE Transactions, Proceedings of IMechE). He has been senior member of several National core technical review committees for critical projects under DRDO, ISRO, NAL etc. He is a senior fellow of the Indian National Academy of Engineering.

Recently, he has been named as one of the top two percent scientists in the world according to a study done by researchers at Stanford University and appearing in the journal Plos Biology (https://journals.plos.org/plosbiology/article/file?id=10.1371/journal.pbio.3000918&type=printable).

=== Mobile Robotics Lab (GCDSL/MRL) ===
Ghose, along with his student K.N. Krishnanand, developed Glowworm swarm optimization and with Animesh Chakravarthy popularized the collision-cone approach

The alumni of the lab have gone on to work on various notable research projects in academia and industry.

Recently, there's been a push for Learning-based projects in the lab, thus increasing collaboration with applied ML (Machine perception) groups in Industry.
