= MABEL (robot) =

Robot engineered in 2009

MABEL is a robot engineered in 2009 by researchers at the University of Michigan, which is well known for being the world's fastest bipedal (two-legged) robot with knees. MABEL is able to reach speeds of up to 3.6 m/s (6.8 mph). The name MABEL is an acronym for Michigan Anthropomorphic Biped With Electronic Legs. The creators include J.W. Grizzle, Jonathan Hurst, Hae-Won Park, Koushil Sreenath, and Alireza Ramezani. MABEL weighs 143 pounds (65 kilograms) with most of its weight being in the top torso area. The legs contain large springs and are jointed to form knees. The robot is attached to a safety boom for lateral stability.

Average Speed	Peak Speed	Ground Clearance
1.95 m/s(4.4 mph)	3.06 m/s(6.8 mph)	3-4 inches

== Motivations for MABEL ==
- Create a robot similar to that of “the RABBIT” (a French bipedal walking robot), but with certain modifications.
- Make a robot that can run fast, adapt to terrain, and use energy efficiently.
- Innovate efficient powertrain and control feedback mechanisms.
- Promote outreach for University of Michigan College of Engineering.

== Features and technology ==
=== Parts ===
- Spring: The hip and knee joints each contain a spring that is connected in series with two motors.
- Point feet: The end of MABEL's legs have a point at the bottom so the foot hits the ground uniformly each time.
- Safety Boom: A large metal pole that acts to stabilize. Since MABEL works in 2D, it is laterally unstable and would fall sideways without the boom.
- Safety Cable: A thin rope attached to the left midsection of MABEL to insure the robot doesn't fall. This was added after MABEL fell the first time testing uneven terrain.

=== Innovative powertrain ===
In order to make MABEL functional for extended periods of time, the researchers focused on ways to optimize powertrain efficiency. Unlike the RABBIT, MABEL was designed to have all four motors in the midsection instead of the legs. This makes the legs lighter and more agile. Secondly, most of MABEL’s power is stored in large springs that act to reduce shock and store energy. MABEL uses a differential so that the spring can be grounded by the torso of the robot instead of directly connected in series with a motor. This allows the compression in the springs to better apply force that pushes up the center of mass. Another innovative aspect of the springs is that they are referred to as “unilateral” because they don’t extend past the rest length, causing undirected force.

=== Feedback control algorithms ===
In order for MABEL to be an independent runner and walker on rough terrain, the engineers used QNX real-time computing and DAQ environment in order to create feedback control. Feedback control constantly feeds in different inputs to the system based on the information from sensors. The controller measures the output values via sensors and compares those values with the desired output. The difference between the measured output and the desired output values is what is called the "error signal". This signal is than used to change the input values of the system accordingly. This method of feedback control makes thousands of adjustments each second in order to stabilize the robot. Because of this system, MABEL is able to not only correct itself, but also to react to inconsistencies in terrain.

== Outreach and media ==
The MABEL robot became well known after a YouTube video, uploaded by u/MichiganEngineering, received over 450,000 views. MABEL was also featured on a CNN segment on September 19, 2011, in which co-creator Prof. Jessy Grizzle was interviewed on live television. Up until August 2014, MABEL has been used for outreach during K-12 student tours of the College of Engineering at University of Michigan. On August 14, 2014, MABEL was put on display in the Chicago Field Museum where it currently resides.

== Future applications ==
In his interview with CNN, Jessy Grizzle stated that this kind of technology could be useful for firefighting situations in which firefighters believe no one is in a burning house but surveillance is necessary. Later in his interview, he also added that the innovative control feedback algorithms could play a role in aiding paralyzed people. He said that the feedback algorithms would be necessary to successfully engineer exoskeletons, mechanical systems that attach to the human body to aid muscle movements. Grizzle is currently collaborating with Jonathan Hurst from the Robotics Institute at Carnegie Mellon to create a new bipedal robot named "MARLO". Instead of walking and running in 2D while connected to a boom, MARLO will move in 3D. A robot in 3D means that the robot would be free-standing without a safety boom or safety cable. During testing in 2013, MARLO took 15 successful steps with no boom to stable itself.
