= Elliott J. Rouse =

American mechanical engineer, roboticist and academic

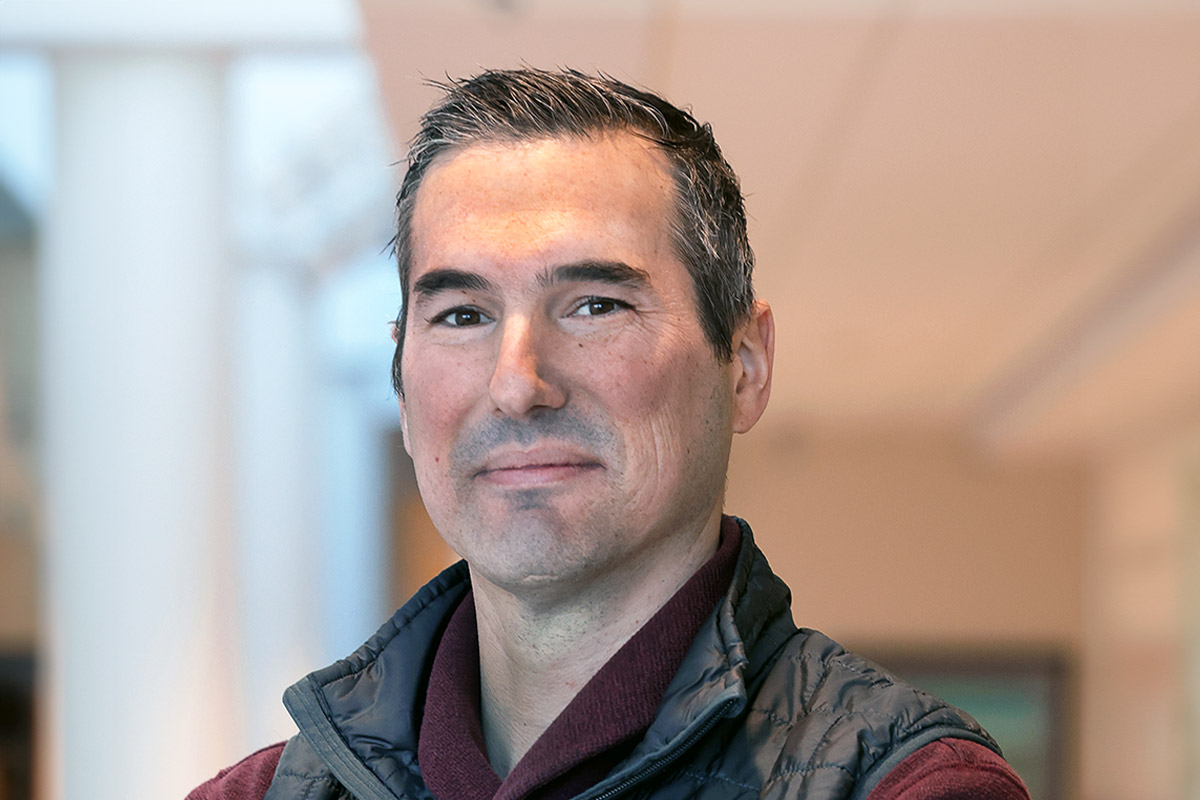
- Occupations: Mechanical engineer, roboticist and academic
- Awards: National Science Foundation CAREER Award (2019); Henry Russel Award, University of Michigan (2024)

Academic background
- Education: B.S. Mechanical Engineering; M.S. Biomedical Engineering; Ph.D. Biomedical Engineering
- Alma mater: The Ohio State University; Northwestern University
- Website: http://www.elliottjrouse.com/

Elliott J. Rouse is an American mechanical engineer, roboticist, and academic. He is an associate professor in the Departments of Robotics and Mechanical Engineering and Director of the Neurobionics Lab at the University of Michigan.

Rouse's research interests encompass precision machine design, exoskeletons/robotic prostheses development, brushless motors, human locomotion dynamics, perception, psychophysics, neural control of movement, biomechanics, and human performance augmentation. His work has been featured on platforms such as TED, Discovery Channel, CNN, National Public Radio, Wired Magazine UK, and Business Insider. He holds multiple patents for wearable robotic systems and has published in journals including Science Robotics, Nature Biomedical Engineering, IEEE Transactions on Mechatronics, and Nature. He is the recipient of the NSF CAREER Award, Departmental Faculty Award, and the Henry Russel Award.

== Education ==
Rouse completed his undergraduate education at Ohio State University, earning a Bachelor of Science in Mechanical Engineering in 2007. While pursuing his degree, he worked full-time in professional Le Mans autoracing at Intersport Racing, where he served as a mechanic and engineer on prototype cars in the American Le Mans Series.

He then pursued graduate studies at Northwestern University, obtaining a Master of Science in Biomedical Engineering in 2009, followed by a Ph.D. in Biomedical Engineering in 2012. After his doctorate, he was a Postdoctoral Fellow at the MIT Media Lab under Hugh Herr from 2012 to 2014.

== Career ==
From 2014 to 2017, Rouse served as an assistant professor at Northwestern University’s Feinberg School of Medicine and Shirley Ryan AbilityLab. During this period, he consulted for the Los Angeles Dodgers’ Research and Development team, contributing to biomechanics projects.

In 2017, he joined the University of Michigan as an assistant professor, later promoted to associate professor in 2022. He co-founded the Department of Robotics at UMich, designing its undergraduate curriculum and courses. In 2021–2022, he took leave to co-found the exoskeleton team at X (The Moonshot Factory) and served as a visiting faculty member. In 2024-2025, he was on sabbatical at the Robotics and AI Institute (RAI Institute) in Cambridge MA. He is a member of the IEEE EMBS Technical Committee on Bio-Robotics and has co-chaired IEEE conferences.

== Research ==
Elliott J. Rouse directs the Neurobionics Lab at the University of Michigan, where his research focuses on wearable robotics, human biomechanics, and rehabilitation technologies. A central theme of his work is the study of system dynamics and its application to the design of robotic prostheses and exoskeletons. His group investigates how variations in leg joint stiffness during gait impact rehabilitation and assistive technologies, publishing foundational studies on ankle impedance in walking and stroke recovery.

Rouse pioneered variable-stiffness prostheses, including the VSPA Foot, a quasi-passive ankle-foot device that adjusts stiffness continuously during use. His lab also developed compliant mechanisms and a novel rotational torsion spring noted for its energy density and compactness, advancing actuator design in robotics.

A key focus of Rouse’s work is understanding user preferences and perceptions in assistive technologies. His group demonstrated that users can perceive metabolic changes while using exoskeletons, and applied behavioral economics to evaluate the effectiveness of exoskeletons, earning the 2023 Editor’s Choice Award from Communications Engineering.

Rouse also leads the NSF-funded Open-Source Leg project, an open-access platform for prosthetic research. The OSL is a modular, knee-ankle robotic leg designed for ease of manufacturing and control, with plans and software freely available online. The project addresses challenges in robotic leg control, a barrier to widespread adoption. Commercialized through Humotech, the OSL is used by more than 20 global research groups. Its first-generation design was published in Nature Biomedical Engineering, and the project won Fast Company’s "Most Innovative" award in 2020.

== Awards and honors ==
- 2019 – NSF CAREER Award
- 2023 – University of Michigan Robotics Department Faculty Award
- 2024 – Henry Russel Award

== Selected articles ==
- Rouse, E. J., Hargrove, L. J., Perreault, E. J., & Kuiken, T. A. (2014). Estimation of human ankle impedance during the stance phase of walking. IEEE Transactions on Neural Systems and Rehabilitation Engineering, 22(4), 870–878.
- Mooney, L. M., Rouse, E. J., & Herr, H. M. (2014). Autonomous exoskeleton reduces metabolic cost of human walking during load carriage. Journal of Neuroengineering and Rehabilitation, 11, 1–11.
- Shepherd, M. K., & Rouse, E. J. (2017). The VSPA foot: A quasi-passive ankle-foot prosthesis with continuously variable stiffness. IEEE Transactions on Neural Systems and Rehabilitation Engineering, 25(12), 2375–2386.
- Azocar, A. F., Mooney, L. M., Duval, J. F., Simon, A. M., Hargrove, L. J., & Rouse, E. J. (2020). Design and clinical implementation of an open-source bionic leg. Nature Biomedical Engineering, 4(10), 941–953.

== Selected presentations ==
- Rouse, E. J. “Open-source bionic legs: Democratizing prosthetics research.” TEDx Talk, 2019.
- Rouse, E. J. Plenary keynote, IEEE International Conference on Robotics and Automation (ICRA), 2021.
- Rouse, E. J. Invited talk, National Science Foundation POSE Summit, 2023.
