= Lufthansa Innovation Hub =

"digital innovation" unit of the global aviation conglomerate Lufthansa Group

The Lufthansa Innovation Hub in Berlin, Germany, is the "digital innovation" unit of the global aviation conglomerate Lufthansa Group. The business is a wholly owned subsidiary of Deutsche Lufthansa AG. The business, whose managing director is Xavier Lagardère, VP of Innovation and Chief Data Officer of Lufthansa Group, has offices in Berlin and Singapore and brings together talent of the German startup ecosystem.

== History ==
The Lufthansa Innovation Hub was created as a result of the Lufthansa Group's strategic initiative “7to1”, which was launched in July 2014. As part of this program, Lufthansa Group announced its intention to invest over 500 million Euro in innovations by 2020, including in the field of “innovation & digitization”. In 2019, the Lufthansa Innovation Hub opened a second office in Singapore.

== Awards ==
The Lufthansa Innovation Hub has been awarded the title of “Germany’s Best Digital Lab” by the German business magazine Capital several times, among others in 2017, 2018, 2020, 2021 and 2023. Furthermore, the Lufthansa Open API, which is a product of the Lufthansa Innovation Hub, was named a “Digital Leader” with an award from the IDG Publishing Group in June 2017. The digital travel assistant “Mission Control” and “AirlineCheckins.com), which were also developed by the Lufthansa Innovation Hub, were both named “Corporate Startup of the Year“ in 2016 and 2017.

== Products ==
The Lufthansa Innovation Hub develops solutions for the Lufthansa Group as well as for the broader travel and mobility tech industry. Among others, it developed a variety of travel-focused smartphone applications and web services launched in Germany, Austria, Switzerland, Great Britain and South Korea, resulting in a five-figure number of new customers for Lufthansa Group. Among others, the “Time2Gate” app, which is designed to show passengers the fastest way to their gate, was included in the company's portfolio as well as the AirlineCheckins.com. The Lufthansa Open API established an open programming interface that allows startups and other third parties to integrate Lufthansa Group data in their own applications. The roadmap includes the option for flight bookings to be made via the interface as well Acting on behalf of the Lufthansa Group Airline, Eurowings, the Lufthansa Innovation Hub developed a “ten-ticket-pass for flying” using a model that is widespread in local public transportation networks. The Lufthansa Innovation Hub also works with the American startup accelerator Plug and Play Tech Center to seek new strategic partners in Silicon Valley. In 2019, the Lufthansa Innovation Hub developed Compensaid, a solution that allows passengers to offset their CO_{2} emissions during the booking process, for example, through financial compensation or Sustainable Aviation Fuel. The Lufthansa Innovation Hub has also founded several new startups. In 2021, the mobility budget platform NAVIT (formerly known as RYDES) and SQUAKE, a solution for calculating and compensating CO_{2} emissions, were spun off. In spring 2023, the Lufthansa Innovation Hub, in collaboration with Miles&More, launched the NFT trading card app Uptrip, which complements existing Miles & More services. It allows passengers of Lufthansa Group airlines to scan their boarding pass in the app and exchange it for NFT trading cards. The cards can be combined into various collections, which, once complete, can be redeemed for rewards such as airport lounge access or flight upgrades. Current ventures at the Lufthansa Innovation Hub include the team offsite platform cloopio and the AI business travel assistant Swifty.

== See also ==
- Lufthansa
- Eurowings
- Miles & More
