= Munich Center for Machine Learning =

German research institution

MCML
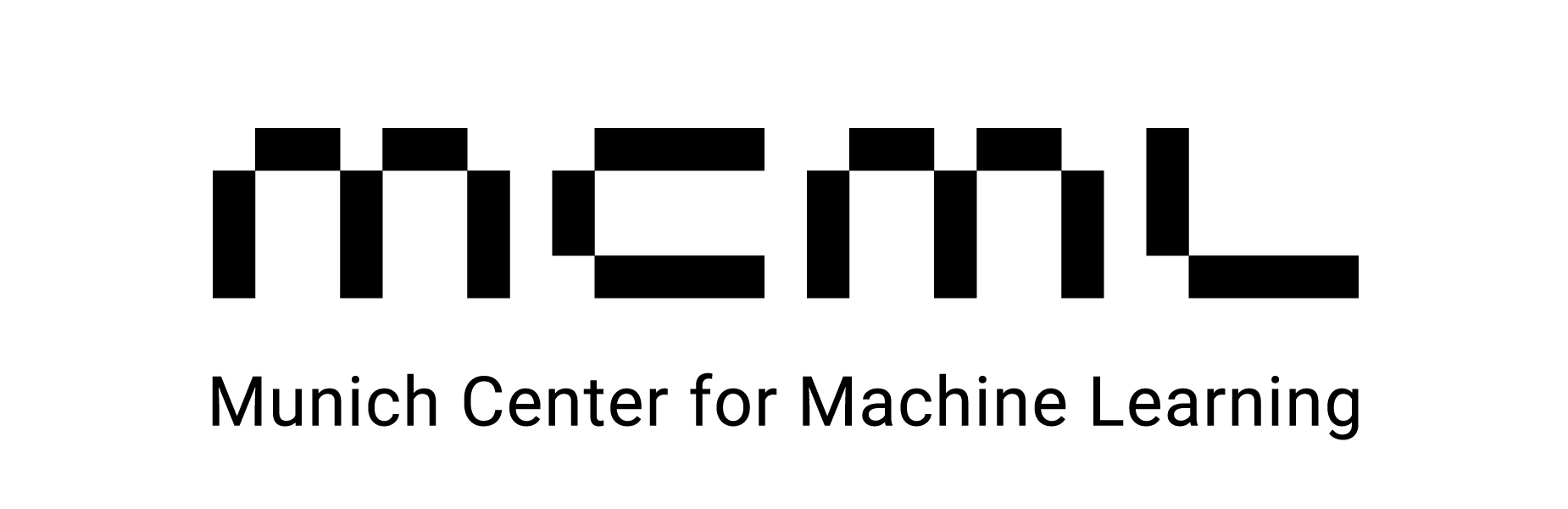
- Formation: 2018
- Type: Research Institute
- Purpose: Machine learning research
- Location: Munich
- Directors: Bernd Bischl, Daniel Cremers, Daniel Rückert, Thomas Seidl
- Parent organization: LMU Munich and Technical University of Munich
- Staff: about 600
- Website: mcml.ai

The Munich Center for Machine Learning (MCML) is a joint research institution of LMU Munich and the Technical University of Munich in the field of machine learning (ML) and artificial intelligence (AI), based in Munich. Founded in 2018, the MCML is one of six German "AI competence centers." It is funded by the Federal Ministry of Research, Technology and Space and the State of Bavaria.

== Research ==
Over 600 scientists work at the MCML in three research areas:

- Foundations of ML
- Perception, Vision, and Natural Language Processing
- Domain-specific ML.

== Leadership ==
The MCML is headed by the four directors Bernd Bischl, Daniel Cremers, Daniel Rückert and Thomas Seidl, as well as the managing directors Elke Achtert (LMU) and Alexandra Stang (TUM).

== See also ==
- Comparison of machine learning software
- Comparison of deep learning software
- List of machine learning algorithms
