= Institut de Robòtica i Informàtica Industrial =

Spanish research institute

Institut de Robòtica i Informàtica Industrial, CSIC-UPC
- Formation: 1995
- Headquarters: Barcelona, Spain
- Website: www.iri.upc.edu

The Institut de Robòtica i Informàtica Industrial, CSIC-UPC (IRI) (in Spanish: Instituto de Robótica e Informática Industrial, in English: Institute of Robotics and Industrial Informatics), is a Joint Research Center of the Spanish National Research Council (CSIC) and the Polytechnical University of Catalonia (UPC). The Institute has three main objectives: to promote fundamental research in Robotics and Applied Informatics, to cooperate with the community in industrial technological projects, and to offer scientific education through graduate courses.

IRI conducts basic and applied research in human-centered robotics and automatic control. The Institute's lines of research are the following:

- Automatic control ;
- Kinematics and robot design;
- Mobile robotics;
- Perception and manipulation.

IRI was created in 1995, and currently is situated in the Mathematics and Statistics Faculty of the Campus Sud of UPC, in Barcelona, Spain.
