= West Texas A&M University =

Public university in Canyon, Texas, US

- Former names: West Texas State Normal College (1910–1923); West Texas State Teachers College (1923–1949); West Texas State College (1949–1963); West Texas State University (1963–1990)
- Motto: Visio Veritas Valor
- Motto in English: Vision. Truth. Bravery.
- Type: Public university
- Established: 1910; 116 years ago
- Parent institution: Texas A&M University System
- Endowment: US$208.6 million (2026)
- Budget: US$154,403,422 (2019–2020)
- President: Neil Terry (interim)
- Academic staff: 350
- Administrative staff: 466
- Students: 10,051
- Undergraduates: 7,338
- Postgraduates: 2,603
- Other students: 110 (2nd Bachelor's)
- Location: Canyon, Texas, U.S. 34.9844°N 101.9134°W
- Campus: Suburban, 342 acres (138 ha)
- Colors: Maroon and white
- Nickname: Buffaloes or Buffs
- Sporting affiliations: NCAA Division II – Lone Star
- Mascot: Buffalo
- Website: www.wtamu.edu

West Texas A&M University (WTAMU or WT) is a public university in Canyon, Texas, United States. It is the northernmost campus of the Texas A&M University System and accredited by the Southern Association of Colleges and Schools (SACS). It was established on September 20, 1910, as West Texas State Normal College, one of the seven state-funded teachers' colleges in Texas.

== History ==
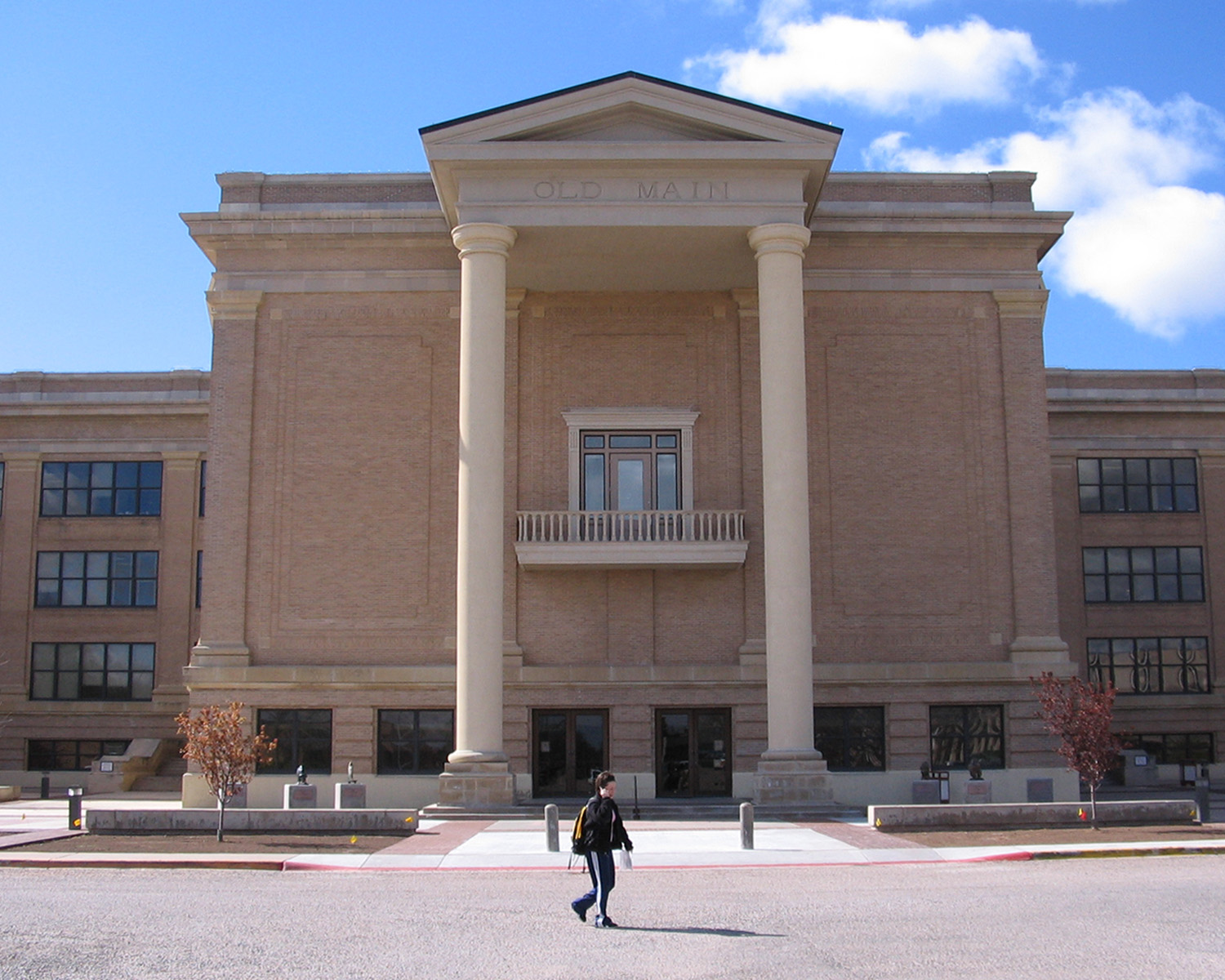
West Texas A&M University Old Main Building

=== 1910 West Texas State Normal College ===
In its first school year, West Texas State Normal College had 152 all-white students and 16 faculty members. Its first president was Robert B. Cousins. A year after the Texas State House of Representatives approved the bill to establish West Texas State Normal College, construction began on the school's Administration Building. It consisted of the school's only classrooms, laboratory, library, and offices. On March 25, 1914, the school burned down; however, classes continued in local churches, courthouses, and vacant buildings. Later, in 1916, a new Administration Building opened. West Texas State Normal College hired famed American artist Georgia O'Keeffe to be the head of the Art Department from the fall of 1916 to February 1918. O'Keeffe has been recognized as the "Mother of American modernism".

=== 1923 West Texas State Teachers College ===
The first four-year college degrees were granted in 1919. In the following years, the college was admitted to the American Association of Teachers Colleges in 1922, the Association of Texas Colleges in 1923, and the Southern Association of Colleges and Secondary Schools in 1925. The school changed its name to West Texas State Teachers College in 1923. In the early 1930s, the Panhandle-Plains Historical Society built its Panhandle-Plains Historical Museum on the campus.

In 1948, a nonconformist leftist sociology professor, Joseph L. Duflot, created a sensation on campus when he told a meeting of the American Federation of Labor in Amarillo that "modern capitalism" is the "No. 1 enemy of the United States economy." A powerful legislator at the time, Sam Hanna of Dallas County, warned that state funding could be jeopardized for any college with "a communist" on the faculty. Though the West Texas regents first dismissed Duflot, he survived a second vote, and regent H.L. Mills praised him for "the courage of his convictions". During the days of West Texas State University, the football team was an enormously successful feeder program for notable professional wrestlers including Tully Blanchard, Dusty Rhodes, Terry Funk, Ted DiBiase, Bobby Duncum, Tito Santana, Barry Windham, Bruiser Brody, Dory Funk Jr., and Stan Hansen, among others.

Many returning veterans from World War II enrolled at the institution in the latter 1940s, taking advantage of new G.I. Bill of Rights assistance. Conditions were so overcrowded for a time that the former soldiers slept in the gymnasium, and beds were brought from a former prisoner of war camp in Hereford.

=== 1949 West Texas State College ===
In 1949, the school again changed its name, this time to West Texas State College. During the Cold War, attention at West Texas State was focused on anticommunism. One history professor, John Cook, claimed that many of the films shown on campus, such as Communism on the Map, were "propaganda". During this time, too, historian J. Evetts Haley ran for governor of Texas on a staunchly conservative platform, but the office went to Marion Price Daniel Sr.

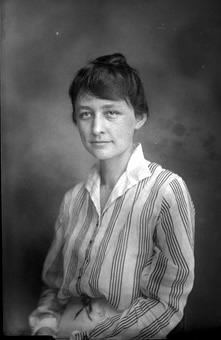
Georgia O'Keeffe, head of the art department from 1916 to 1918

=== 1963 West Texas State University ===
At its founding the school admitted only white students. The first black student to graduate was Helen Neal in 1962. During the 1960s, the school changed from a regional teacher's college to a state university. In 1963, Governor John B. Connally signed a bill to change the school's name to West Texas State University. The newly named school gained a College of Arts and Sciences, a graduate school, and professional schools of business. Near the end of the 1960s, West Texas State obtained its own board of regents, established a School of Agriculture and a School of Fine Arts, and created a Department of Nursing.

By 1970, the student enrollment neared 8,000, but was decreasing. The primary reasons were the changes in the Selective Service System and increases in tuition. The university's funding was largely enrollment-driven, and this caused serious financial problems for the school.

The college radio station KWTS began broadcasting in 1972. The West Texas State athletics were in the National Collegiate Athletic Association (NCAA) Division I Missouri Valley Conference, but the school decided to change its status to Division II and the Lone Star Conference in 1984.

In 1986, WT President Ed Roach was the subject of protests and calls for his resignation over the amount of money spent on the campus's Presidential House. The 7,301 sq ft (678.3 m^{2}) house cost $991,000, which was more than the $494,900 authorized by the State College Coordinating Board. In 1991, Roach was indicted for diverting scholarship money to meet other budget deficits.

=== 1993 West Texas A&M University ===
The university joined the Texas A&M University System on September 1, 1990, and started to use the name West Texas A&M University in 1993. The letters "A&M" are short for "Agricultural and Mechanical", taken from the Morrill Land-Grant Acts. The school's first president under the new system was Barry B. Thompson. Early in Thompson's tenure, he dropped the school's football program, but the program returned a year later without athletic scholarships.

President Thompson was appointed chancellor of the Texas A&M University System in 1994 and Russell C. Long became the new president. During Long's tenure, the school renovated buildings, maintained its student enrollment growth, and added its first PhD in agriculture.

The school had a long-term connection with T. Boone Pickens, who was appointed to its board of regents in 1969. On March 21, 1973, Pickens resigned from the board in protest, but was reappointed in 1981 and became its chair in 1982. He continued to chair its board until its merger with the Texas A&M system in 1990. In 1987, he pledged a $1.5 million matching gift to endow its business school, which was named in his honor. On November 24, 2004, the school issued a press release stating that it planned to remove Pickens' name from the T. Boone Pickens College of Business after university officials came to believe he had not completed pledges he made to the university. In fact, Pickens had satisfied his pledge, but asked to have his name removed. On December 1, 2004, the then-President Russell C. Long acknowledged the error and agreed to remove Pickens' name. Subsequently, Pickens donated $165 million to Oklahoma State University-Stillwater. In 2007, Pickens endowed the Pickens Professorship of Business and in 2010, he endowed the Pickens Professorship of Management. In 2017, the business school was named the Paul and Virginia Engler College of Business in recognition of the largest gift ($80 million) received by the university in its history.

In late 2005, Long retired from his position as the school's president, and J. Patrick O'Brien took that office in early 2006.

During the tenure of President O'Brien, WTAMU saw a surge of construction projects completed, including the Sybil B. Harrington Fine Arts Complex, the Hayward Spirit Tower, the Charles K. and Barbara Kerr Vaughan Pedestrian Mall, the Buffalo Sports Park (including Wilder Park and Schaeffer Field), a new entrance/climbing wall and renovations in the Virgil Hensen Activity Center, Buff Hall, Centennial Hall, Founders Hall, two new parking lots, Victory Circle, the JBK Student Center Expansion, Classroom Center/WTBookstore renovation, Engineering and Computer Science Building renovation and the implementation of the WT Amarillo Center in Center City, Amarillo.

In January 2009, the university began its first comprehensive campaign to raise $35 million for scholarships, faculty/program support, and capital projects. The Share your Pride campaign ended in August 2014 and raised more than $50 million.

The university briefly attracted national attention in 2023 when the university's president cancelled a student group's drag show on campus. Shortly thereafter, the university's faculty senate voted "no confidence" in president Wendler, harshly criticizing his leadership beyond just that one decision.

During 2024 the university has banned access to gambling sites through university resources, including any WT-owned cell phones, laptops, tablets, desktops, and Wi-Fi.

== Academics ==
Academic rankings

Master's
- Washington Monthly: 266

Regional
- U.S. News & World Report: 83

West Texas A&M University is considered a selective university with an acceptance rate of 67.4% (2014). The university offers 60 undergraduate programs, 38 master's programs, and two doctoral programs through its six colleges/schools and graduate school. U.S. News & World Report in Best Colleges for 2021 ranked West Texas A&M University #83 in all the Regional Universities West. In 2021, U.S. News & World Report ranked WTAMU #15 in U.S. and #1 in Texas for Best Online Graduate Information Technology program. In 2021, U.S. News & World Report ranked WTAMU #18 in U.S. and #1 in Texas for Best Online Master's in Business Programs. WTAMU was also ranked No. 21 in U.S. and #1 in Texas for Best Online Bachelor's Programs.

The university's Buffalo Sports Park is home to the largest grouping of synthetic athletic fields in the United States and its Advanced Wind Turbine Test Facility is one of the largest testing facilities in the world for both large and small wind turbines.

=== Research ===
Along with the Advanced Wind Turbine Test Facility, West Texas A&M University uses the Killgore Research Center, which houses the Attebury Honors Program, Ronald E. McNair Scholars Program, and WTAMU Academic and Research Environmental Health and Safety office, to conduct research on blood-borne pathogens, biosafety, and occupational health.

The newly renovated Palo Duro Research Facility (PDRF) opened in August 2010 promote collaborative research and alliances for research collaboration that houses Environmental Quality & Technology Research Laboratory, Environmental Labs and University Research Alliance.

To help meet the research needs of the cattle industry, WTAMU operates Beef Carcass Research Center and Feedlot Research Group. WTAMU co-manages Cross Bar Cooperative Management Area, a 12,000 acre prairie site owned by the Bureau of Land Management (BLM) to facilitate outdoor research to reduce negative interactions between wildlife and people.

WTAMU also teams up with several other institutions such as the Alternative Energy Institute, Athletic Training Room and Education Laboratory, Center for the Study of the American West, Computer Information Systems Software and Network Security Testing Lab, Cooperative Research, Education, and Extension Team, and Dryland Agricultural Institute to conduct research initiatives.

== Demographics ==
Undergraduate demographics as of Fall 2023
Race and ethnicity	Total
American Indian/Alaska Native	1%
White	51%
Hispanic	34%
Black	4%
Unknown	4%
Two or more races	3%
Asian	2%
International student	2%
Economic diversity
Low-income (Note: The percentage of students who received an income-based federal Pell grant intended for low-income students.)	43%
Affluent (Note: The percentage of students who are a part of the American middle class at the bare minimum.)	57%

WTAMU student demographics
Gender, age, ethnicity, and geographic origin (fall 2020)

Gender
- Female: 5,878
- Male: 4,173

Age
- Average age: 26

Ethnicity
- White: 55.97%
- Hispanic: 28.71%
- African American: 5.34%
- Asian American: 2.97%
- Native American: 0.49%
- Pacific Islander: 0.12%
- International: 2.30%
- Two or more races listed: 3.07%
- Other/unknown: 1.01%

Geographic origin
- Texas: 79.9%
- Out-of-state: 17.77%
- International: 2.33%

West Texas A&M University has a student body with almost 56% of it being female and 40% being made up by minorities. An overwhelming number of the student body are native Texans (80%), while around 285 students are from other countries.

== Campus ==
The Jack B. Kelley Student Center is home to The Legends Club, Starbucks, a Chick-fil-a Express, a Which Wich, Pony Express Burritos, and a convenience store.

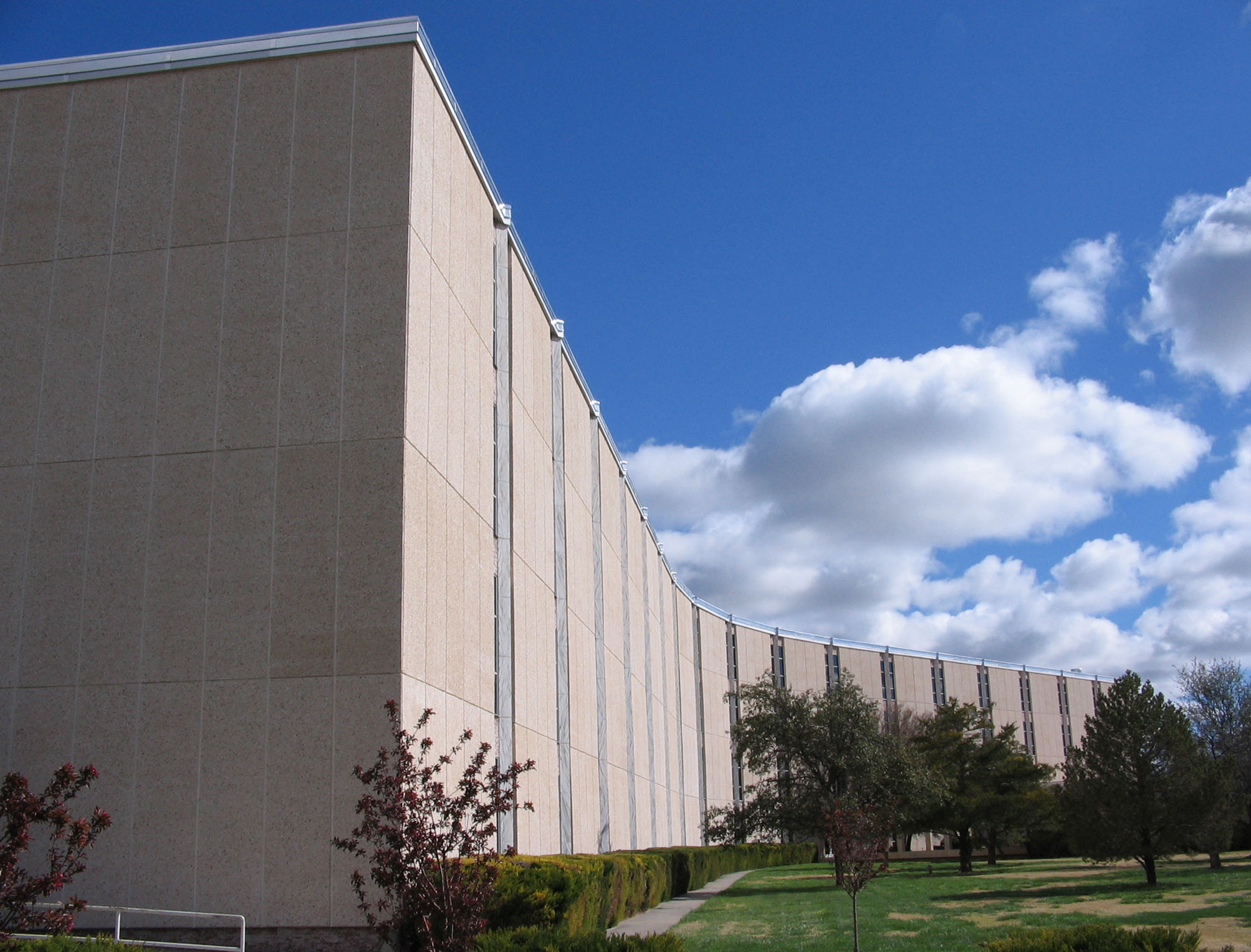
West Texas A&M Classroom Center building

The Classroom Center was built in 1968. The four-story building contains classrooms, computer and writing labs, and faculty offices. The College of Business and the Department of English and Modern Languages are located in the Classroom Center. The Classroom Center had its reopening on August 24, 2009, for the start of the fall semester.

Mary Moody Northen Hall accommodates music studios, dance studios, a public art gallery, recital hall, art studios, computer labs, and classrooms.

The Agriculture and Sciences Building was constructed in 1974. The three-story building houses the Division of Agriculture and the Department of Life, Earth, and Environmental Sciences. The building contains classrooms, laboratories, and faculty offices. The Agricultural Sciences Complex opened in the summer of 2018. Located in the northeast corner of campus, the facility is almost 160,000 square feet and includes classrooms, labs, offices, a meats lab, agriculture event center, and a pavilion for animal showing, handling, and evaluation. The Agriculture program was named the Paul Engler College of Agriculture and Natural Sciences in 2017, in honor of the largest gift in the university's history.

The Engineering and Computer Sciences Building was renovated in 2011 and again in 2017. It is home to the College of Engineering.

A veteran's war memorial is expected to be revealed on Memorial Day 2018.

The Texas history museum, Panhandle-Plains Historical Museum, has been located on the campus of West Texas A&M University since the early 1930s.

=== Amarillo Center ===
The WTAMU Amarillo Center is located on the 10th and 11th floors of the Chase building in Amarillo, Texas. A permanent campus is being built at 8th Avenue and South Tyler Street, starting with the Commerce Building, which is planned to open in the fall of 2018. The new facility will be home to the WTAMU Center for Learning Disabilities, Speech and Hearing Clinic, Panhandle Area Health Education Center, Small Business Development Center, Licensed Professional Counseling, social work program, psychology program, special education program, and instructional technology program.

== Athletics ==
WTAMU Athletics logo

West Texas A&M athletic teams are the Buffaloes (or simply called the "Buffs," while the women's teams are known as the "Lady Buffs"). The university is a member of the Division II level of the National Collegiate Athletic Association (NCAA), primarily competing in the Lone Star Conference (LSC) since the 1994–95 academic year; which they were a member on a previous stint from 1986–87 to 1990–91.

West Texas A&M competes in 14 intercollegiate varsity sports: Men's sports include baseball, basketball, cross country, football, golf, soccer and track & field; while women's sports include basketball, cross country, golf, soccer, softball, track & field and volleyball.

=== Softball ===
The Lady Buffs softball team won the 2014 NCAA Division II national championship in Salem, Virginia. The team was coached by Kevin Blaskowski and led on the field by Alyssa Lemos, Renee Erwin, and Rita Hokianga.

In 2021 West Texas A&M won back-to-back games in the D-II softball national championship series to win the 2021 national championship.
