= National Centre for Nuclear Robotics =

Science and research consortium in the United Kingdom

Coordinates: 52°27′14.03″N 1°55′44.92″W

- Established: 2018; 8 years ago
- Research type: Research
- Budget: £42 million (2018)
- Field of research: Artificial intelligence Robotics; Environmental science Photon science Data science Computational science
- Director: Rustam Stolkin
- Location: Birmingham
- Affiliations: University of Birmingham; University of Edinburgh; Lancaster University; University of Essex; Queen Mary University of London; University of Lincoln; University of Bristol; University of the West of England, Bristol
- Operating agency: University of Birmingham
- Website: www.ncnr.org.uk

National Centre for Nuclear Robotics (NCNR) is a science and engineering research consortium of eight universities in the UK led by the University of Birmingham, aiming to develop technologies to address the problem of nuclear waste in the UK. As part of the initiative NCNR is developing technologies such as machine vision, artificial intelligence and advanced robotics to decommission 4.9 million tonnes of nuclear waste generated by the nuclear industry in the country over the past since the early 1950s.

== Overview ==
NCNR was launched in 2018 and the University of Birmingham obtained £42 million in funding, co-funded by the Engineering and Physical Sciences Research Council, to establish it. The consortium of the eight universities consists of the University of Birmingham, University of Bristol, University of Edinburgh, Lancaster University, University of Essex, Queen Mary University of London, University of Lincoln and University of the West of England. As of 2018, Rustam Stolkin is the Director of NCNR.

The research team at the University of Birmingham studied the motive behind robots executing tasks like humans in order to safely work alongside people. The team consisted of Valerio Ortenzi, Marco Controzzi, Francesca Cini, Juxi Leitner, Matteo Bianchi, Maximo A Roa, Peter Corke. This research was published in Nature Machine Intelligence journal.

Lancaster University aims to develop computing system software to make the robots semi-autonomous, which will simplify human control done remotely due to the highly radioactive environments surrounding nuclear waste in which the robots operate. The researchers at the Lancaster University developed a mobile robotic system consisting of imaging software and a Microsoft Kinect camera added to it with two manipulating arms, making it easier to identify, grasp and cut objects such as metal pipes, commonly found in nuclear decommissioning sites. The research team consisted of Manuel Bandala, Craig West, Stephen Monk, Allahyar Montazeri, and James Taylor, and the research was published in MDPI Robotics journal.

As part of the consortium, the University of Essex aims to research the effects of radiation on the electronics of robotic systems and develop new methodologies to increase the resilience of hardware and software of the electronics systems, and to provide resilience and robustness against radiation damage. The work is an active collaboration between the consortium partners and NASA Jet Propulsion Laboratory. The researchers at the University of Essex developed a methodology named SoCodeCNN to bridge the gap between natural language processing and computer vision using convolutional neural networks, aiming to increase the resilience of the electronics systems hardware and software against radiation damage. The research team behind the development of SoCodeCNN is led by Klaus McDonald-Maier and consisted of Somdip Dey, Amit Kumar Singh and Dilip Kumar Prasad. SoCodeCNN was highlighted as the most popular paper in the IEEE Access journal after publication.

The University of Lincoln is developing vision-guided self-learning mobile robots. The aim of the research team at the University of Lincoln is to build systems which can use machine learning to adapt to the unique conditions of nuclear sites contaminated by radiation. The research team is led by Gerhard Neumann.

As part of the consortium, University of Bristol developed specially-equipped drones using remote-sensing lidar to map the most radioactive places in the Chernobyl's Red Forest.

== See also ==
- Nuclear waste
- Artificial intelligence
