= Alternative Energy Institute =

Alternative energy research institute

- Type: Energy research institute
- Established: 1977
- Location: Canyon, Texas, U.S.
- Website: www.altenergy.org

Alternative Energy Institute (AEI) was an American energy research institute and West Texas A&M University's alternative energy research branch. Formed in 1977, the program was nationally and internationally recognized, and along with research provides education and outreach around the U.S. and the globe.

== History ==
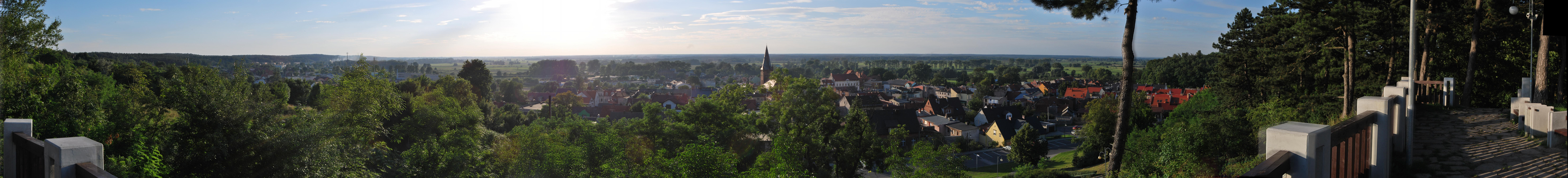
The Alternative Energy Institute Regional Wind Test Center

AEI was founded at West Texas State University (now West Texas A&M University) in 1977 by Dr. Vaughn Nelson, Dr. Earl Gilmore and Dr. Robert Barieau during the 1973 oil crisis. The physics department at West Texas State was already experimenting with wind power and these three individuals took the initiative to found a department to concentrate upon the study of wind. The basic goals of the department were:

- To test wind turbine designs.
- Improve on current aerodynamic design.
- Teach public about the state of wind & solar technology.

=== First Decade: 1977 - 1987 ===
Initially, much of the organization's focus was on small wind turbine research and improving blade designs. At this time they installed test turbines and water pumping applications throughout Texas. These projects allowed AEI to develop and improve upon blade design theory and production. During this period the organization also provided consulting in Latin America, Jamaica, Hawaii, and Europe. There, AEI trained villages and groups in wind energy systems.

At this time AEI operated from three locations: one off-campus and two on-campus. At these locations they customized testing on blade designs, turbine generator units, and complete designs.

=== Second Decade: 1987 - 1997 ===
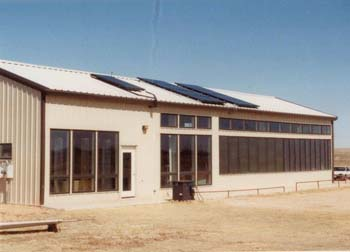
AEI's Solar Energy Building

During this decade the organization focused on green building projects. The most notable of these was AEI's Solar Energy Building. Finished in 1993, the building served as the main site for AEI's operations for seventeen years. The building covered all of the organization's energy usage, including an on-site 10 kW Bergey wind turbine installation, and 3 kW of photovoltaics.

Several electric vans were donated to the organization at this time, two of which were maintained for several years. These vans were used to collect data and complete local wind energy projects, as well as to give campus and test site tours.

Starting in 1995, AEI began working with the Texas General Land Office to provide Texas Wind Data to the public. While the GLO data sites have since been decommissioned, the organization still collects, analyzes and publishes Texas Wind Data for the general public.

=== Now: 2022 - Present ===
AEI is currently focusing on developing a new degree plan at WTAMU as well as continuing its research on green energy systems. In terms of turbine testing, the organization focuses on small blade and turbine testing, particularly innovative horizontal and vertical axis designs.

In 2010, the AEI test site was moved to the Nance Ranch. At this time, the organization's offices were also moved, to WTAMU's Palo Duro Research Facility.

In the late 90s, AEI also began developing a fortran program called ROTOR. The program could predict theoretical power curves for blade designs and produce screen and printed output of this. The program has been modified a few times since then and is still being used today.

During this time, AEI's Wind Data program has greatly expanded. In addition to working with wind farmers to provide data for the public, the organization also analyzes and publishes data for private organizations. In total, the organizations now collects data from 75 sites scattered across Texas. 50 of these data sites are archived online, 31 of which offer data for public use by researchers and developers.

== Education ==
=== Courses ===
Since 2009, AEI has been offering online alternative energy courses at WTAMU on Wind energy, Solar energy and Renewable energy. Currently, WT offers one course per semester, with alternating subjects. The courses are taught by AEI staff and are open to WT students and those seeking certification.

In addition to the online courses offered by WTAMU, AEI has also authored renewable energy textbooks and educational CDs. The CDs cover the subjects of wind energy, wind turbines, solar energy and wind water pumping. Some CDs are also available in Spanish.

=== Seminars & Symposiums ===
==== Windy Land Owners ====
Started in 1989, AEI has been giving annual Windy Land Owners seminars. Designed to teach land owners and other interested parties general information about the wind industry, most of the seminars took place in the states surrounding Texas. Due to increased interest, AEI began giving seminars in Texas starting in 2001.

Topics covered at these seminars include:

- Wind farm basics
- Wind resources in Texas
- Potential problem and contract considerations

Starting in 2009, AEI also began offering presentations from the WLO Seminars online for general information.

==== WEATS ====
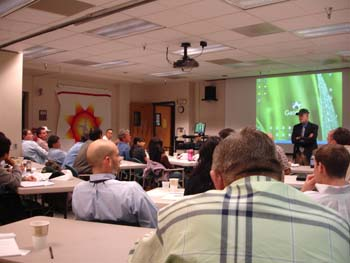
AEI's Assistant Director of Training, Education and Outreach lecturing at WEATS 2007.

AEI's Solar Energy Building

Launched in 1998, The Wind Energy Applications Training Symposium (WEATS) is an internationally acclaimed workshop for the Native American community. Designed for project planners, developers, utility officials, and engineers directly involved with energy projects, it is used for both networking and developing practical knowledge.

Topics covered at this symposium include:

- Practical knowledge and analytical tools for conducting project pre-feasibility and identification analysis
- Implementation of small and large wind energy projects
- Lectures from National Renewable Energy Laboratory and local experts about the capabilities of the technology and the economic and financial aspects of sustainable project development
- Site visits

== Community Involvement ==
In addition to its seminars and workshops, AEI also regularly offers consulting to potential wind farmers and hosts tours of its research facilities.

As part of its community outreach, the organization also presents at the Caprock Science Fair and other local schools, informing students about wind energy via displays, demonstrations and brochures at the elementary, junior high and high school levels.

== See also ==
- List of energy storage projects
