= Instituto de Automática =

Argentine research institute

INAUT Logo

The Automation Institute (Spanish: Instituto de Automática) is an Argentine Research Institution in San Juan Province (Argentina) dedicated to researching advanced topics of control engineering, robotics and electronics.

== History ==
INAUT was created in 1973 under the umbrella of the National University of San Juan. It is one of the 14 Research Institutes that operate under the auspices of this academic institution.

== Research area ==
The scope of the institute is, broadly, the research and development of Automatic Control. Currently the following research programs are being conducted: robotics, manufacturing, process control, control AI, industrial electronics, and sensors. International cooperation is encouraged and many projects are being executed jointly with similar International Research Centers. One important goal of the institute is to successfully achieve technology transfer to the public and private industry sectors.

INAUT is in San Juan, Argentina. It includes laboratories, libraries, conference rooms, workshops and administrative offices. Personnel includes professional researchers, scholars, and technical staff, for a total of 27 people. The institute is now committed to developing very specialized human resources, and to fostering these research areas in the country.

== Financial sources ==
- National University of San Juan
- National Science and Technology Secretary (SECYT) and National Agency for Science and Technology Promotion (ANPCyT ANPCyT)
- International Agencies (ICI, CYTED, DAAD, EU, INCO, ALFA, CAPES)
- National Research Council (CONICET)
- Technology transfer funds

== See also ==
- Universidad Nacional de San Juan
