= Samsung R&D Institute India, Bengaluru =

Samsung R&D Institute India - Bangalore (SRI-B)
- Founded: 2004
- Headquarters: India
- Parent: Samsung Electronics

Samsung R&D Institute India - Bangalore (SRI - Bangalore), earlier known as Samsung Electronics India Software Operations (SISO), is one of the 30 Research & Development centers of Samsung Electronics globally, housed in the IT hub of India, Bangalore. SRI - Bangalore is the largest R&D center of the South Korean conglomerate outside its home country, South Korea.

The organisation has executed close to 300 projects since its formation. SRI-B works with many organisations involved in the field of software and technology in India.

In 2012, the main office was shifted to Bagmane Constellation Business Park near Doddanekkundi, Bangalore.

== Divisions ==
- Advanced Technologies Division
- B2B
- Digital Printing Division
- System LSI Division
- Memory Solutions Division
- Telecom and Network Division
- Wireless Terminals Division
- Android Platform Division
- Samsung Health Care and SmartSchool solutions
- Tizen Platform Division
- CRL
