= CEITEC =

Brazilian technology center

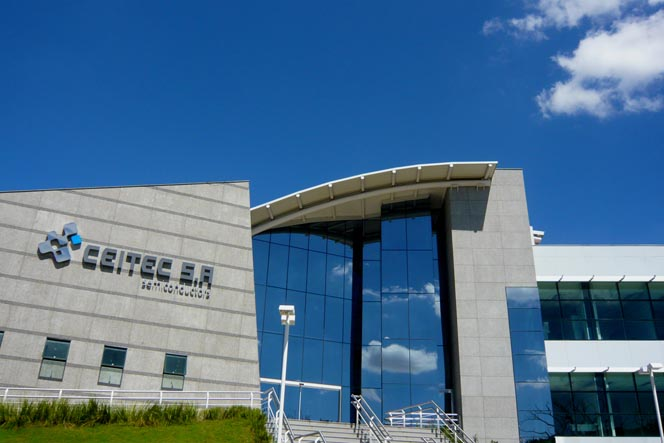
- Type: Government-owned corporation
- Industry: Semiconductors
- Founded: November 7, 2008
- Headquarters: Porto Alegre, Brazil
- Products: RFID, Digital media and Wireless Communication
- Owner: Brazilian Government
- Website: www.ceitec-sa.com

The Centro Nacional de Tecnologia Electrônica Avançada S.A (CEITEC - National Center for Advanced Electronic Technology) is a Brazilian technology center specialized in project development and fabrication in microelectronics, i.e. integrated circuits, or "chips". This center is one of the agents for the Brazilian Microelectronics Program (PNM - Programa Nacional de Microelectrônica).

The main objective of CEITEC is to provide an incentive to the production of semiconductor components and microelectronics education. This project is part of the technology and industrial development policy of the federal Brazilian government. The initiative is a result of a partnership between governmental entities, universities, research centers and companies it is operating in a facility in Porto Alegre, state of Rio Grande do Sul.

On 5 June 2021, president Jair Bolsonaro initiated the liquidation of Ceitec.

On 2 January 2023, presidente Lula da Silva suspended the process of liquidation. On January 2, 2023 Luciana Santos entered the office of Minister of Science, Technology and Innovations. Among other things, she promised to review the liquidation.

== Research and Products ==
- Chip for animal identification

Chip for animal identification is CEITEC S.A.’s first commercial product and is the first chip designed in Brazil by Brazilian engineers in a company that was home grown and home funded to reach volume production at a world-class semiconductor manufacturing facility. This IC device is used for cattle tracking – essentially an electronic cow ID. Embedded in an ear ring, the chip can be read within a distance of 50 cm. The chip was designed entirely in Brazil and is competitively priced. This device is being manufactured at X-Fab Silicon Foundries in Germany. This company has been chosen by CEITEC to produce the Chip for animal identification design at its facilities because X-Fab CMOS 0.6 micron technology is the same that will soon be available in CEITEC’s own factory that will be the first of its kind in Latin America to manufacture RF analog/digital products. It can produce up to 100 million chips per year using 6-inch wafers.

CEITEC’s Chip for animal identification is an advanced LF-RFID device designed for use in Brazil’s cattle industry as part of a leading-edge system to track livestock. Forecasted domestic demand for the chip is as high as 1.5 million units for 2012 with an expected minimum growth rate of 10 percent a year over the next decade.

- Transportation Chip

The chip contains all vehicle data, including chassis and national registration numbers, taxes and fines not paid, etc.

- Blood Bag Chip

The chip is embedded in an electronic tag. It ensures the traceability and safety of blood products.

== Design House ==
The Design House worked on projects funded by FINEP.

== Objectives ==
=== General ===
- To offer infrastructure in form of labs, equipment and human resources to companies, research and development (R&D) centers and universities in order to promote the microelectronic technology in Brazil.
- Stimulate the local development in microelectronic projects and education, which implies new qualified jobs and income distribution.

=== Specific ===
- Support human resources qualification in integrated circuit production processes;
- Provide integrated circuit production services to industries and for scientific and technological research purposes;
- Stimulate the construction of a national network of technological services, enabling the qualification of electronics products and processes;
- Transfer technology on microelectronics to companies in the electronics sector for the competitive qualification of products, processes, and services.
