= Jessy W. Grizzle =

American engineer and professor

- Scientific career
- Fields: engineering
- Workplaces: University of Michigan

Jessy W. Grizzle is an American engineer and Elmer G. Gilbert Distinguished University Professor of Engineering at the University of Michigan. He is also the Jerry W. and Carol L. Levin Professor of Engineering.

== Awards and honors ==
Jessy W. Grizzle has been recognized for his contributions to engineering and robotics. He is a Fellow of the IEEE.

He received the Paper of the Year Award from the IEEE Vehicular Technology Society in 1993, the George S. Axelby Award in 2002, the Control Systems Technology Award in 2003, the Bode Prize in 2012, the IEEE Transactions on Control Systems Technology Outstanding Paper Award in 2014, the IEEE Transactions on Automation Science and Engineering, Googol Best New Application Paper Award in 2019, and the Kalman Prize for Best Paper in the Journal of Dynamic Systems Measurement and Control in 2023.

He holds the Guinness Book of World Records' record for operating a bipedal robot for the longest time in the coldest temperature (-22C for 1 hour and 2 minutes in 2019). His work on bipedal locomotion has been the subject of numerous plenary lectures and has been featured on CNN, ESPN, and more.
