= Nature Biomedical Engineering =

- Discipline: Biomedical engineering
- Language: English
- Edited by: Pep Pàmies

Publication details
- History: 2017–present
- Publisher: Nature Portfolio
- Frequency: Monthly
- Open access: Hybrid
- Impact factor: 26.3 (2024)

Standard abbreviations
- ISO 4: Nat. Biomed. Eng.

Indexing
- CODEN: NBEAB3
- ISSN: 2157-846X
- LCCN: 2010202471
- OCLC no.: 668233028

Links
- Journal homepage; Online archive

Nature Biomedical Engineering is a monthly peer-reviewed scientific journal published by Nature Portfolio. It was established in 2017. The editor-in-chief is Pep Pàmies.

== Abstracting and indexing ==
The journal is abstracted and indexed in:

- Science Citation Index Expanded
- Scopus

According to the Journal Citation Reports, the journal has a 2024 impact factor of 26.3.
