= Stanford Intelligent Systems Laboratory =

Research laboratory

- Nickname: SISL
- Established: January 2014
- Field of research: Decision making under uncertainty, Artificial intelligence
- Director: Mykel J. Kochenderfer
- Location: 496 Lomita Mall; Durand Building, Room 255; Stanford, CA 94305; USA, Stanford, CA, USA
- Operating agency: Stanford University Aeronautics & Astronautics
- Website: sisl.stanford.edu

Stanford Intelligent Systems Laboratory (SISL) is a laboratory researching advanced algorithms and analytical methods for the design of robust decision making systems at Stanford University. It operates within the Stanford Department of Aeronautics & Astronautics.

== Drone research ==
SISL has conducted research in autonomous anti-collision technologies for drones. These efforts include developing software to increase drone reaction times when flying in crowded spaces, such as urban areas. Research was done in accordance with NASA's UAS Traffic Management (UTM) project.

== Funding ==
SISL is supported by numerous external sponsors, including the Federal Aviation Administration (FAA), MIT Lincoln Laboratory, National Aeronautics and Space Administration (NASA), National Science Foundation, Bosch, and SAP.

== See also ==
- Stanford Artificial Intelligence Laboratory
- List of artificial intelligence algorithms
- AlphaDev, AlphaEvolve, AlphaTensor — AI systems by Google DeepMind for discovering and optimizing algorithms
