= Networking and Information Technology Research and Development =

NiTRD

Networking and Information Technology Research and Development Program
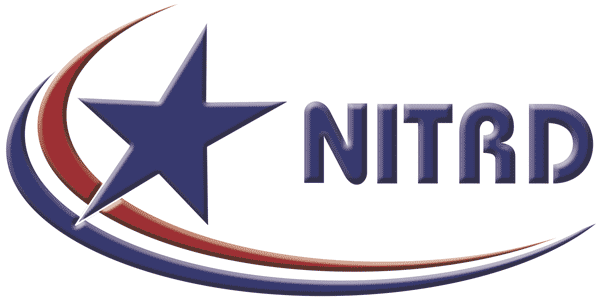
- Logo

Agency overview
- Formed: Established: January 3, 1991
- Jurisdiction: United States
- Headquarters: Washington, DC, U.S.
- Agency executive: Kirk Dohne, Director of the NITRD NCO
- Website: www.nitrd.gov

The Networking and Information Technology Research and Development (NITRD) program consists of a group of U.S. federal agencies to research and develop information technology (IT) capabilities to empower Federal missions; support U.S. science, engineering, and technology leadership; and bolster U.S. economic competitiveness.

== Organization ==
The NITRD Program is managed by the NITRD Subcommittee of the National Science and Technology Council’s (NSTC) Committee on Technology and supported by the NITRD National Coordination Office (NCO).

=== Working Groups ===
NITRD Program’s member agencies coordinate their NITRD research activities and plans by Interagency Working Groups (IWGs). For each IWG, agency representatives meet to exchange information and collaborate on research plans and activities such as testbeds, workshops, and cooperative proposal solicitations.

=== Program Component Areas ===
The annual NITRD Supplement to the President’s Budget is organized by Program Component Areas (PCAs), where the PCAs are major subject areas for federal IT R&D. PCAs are intended to facilitate budgetary comparisons from year to year in each area. The PCA set evolves over time, reflecting changes in IT R&D activities at federal agencies and IT R&D priorities of the Administration. In its first annual report to Congress, the Supplement to the President’s Fiscal Year 1992 Budget, HPCC reported a FY 1991 base budget of $489 million, with eight federal agencies participating, and four R&D components. The FY 2024 NITRD Supplement to the President’s Budget reports to Congress an estimated budget of $10.9B billion across 25 Federal agencies and 12 R&D focus areas.

=== Participating agencies ===
The following federal agencies report their IT research budgets in the NITRD "crosscut" and provide proportional funding to support NITRD's operations:

Department of Commerce

- National Institute of Standards and Technology (NIST)
- National Oceanic and Atmospheric Administration (NOAA)
- The United States Patent and Trademark Office (USPTO)

Department of Defense

- Defense Advanced Research Projects Agency (DARPA)
- National Security Agency (NSA)
- Office of the Secretary of Defense (OSD) and Service Research Organizations
- Air Force Office of Scientific Research (AFOSR)
- Air Force Research Laboratory (AFRL)
- Army Research Laboratory (ARL)
- Office of Naval Research (ONR)

Department of Energy

- National Nuclear Security Administration (DOE/NNSA)
- Office of Cybersecurity, Energy Security, and Emergency Response (DOE/CESER)
- Office of Science (DOE/SC)

Department of Health and Human Services

- Agency for Healthcare Research and Quality (AHRQ)
- National Institutes of Health (NIH)
- National Institute for Occupational Safety and Health (NIOSH)
- Office of the National Coordinator for Health Information Technology (ONC)

Department of Homeland Security

- Science and Technology Directorate (DHS S&T)

Department of the Interior

- U.S. Geological Survey

Department of Justice

- National Institute of Justice (NIJ)

Department of State

- Department of State (DOS)

Department of Veteran Affairs

- National Artificial Intelligence Institute (NAII)

Independent Agencies

- National Aeronautics and Space Administration (NASA)
- National Reconnaissance Office (NRO)
- National Science Foundation (NSF)

Representatives of other agencies also participate.

=== Coordination ===
NITRD's National Coordination Office (NCO) supports NITRD's planning, budget, and assessment activities. The NCO also supports the NITRD Subcommittee, which coordinates the NITRD Program, and the organizations that report to the Subcommittee. The NCO's director is appointed by the Director of the White House Office of Science and Technology Policy.

The NCO works with the NITRD agencies, IWGs, CGs and the White House Office of Management and Budget to prepare, publish, and disseminate the Program's annual supplement to the President's Budget, Federal networking and IT R&D plans, and networking and IT research needs reports.

The NCO provides technical support for the activities of the Networking and Information Technology Subcommittee of the President's Council of Advisors on Science and Technology, a panel of experts from industry and academia, in assessing the NITRD Program and preparing associated reports.

The NCO maintains the NITRD Web site – The Networking and Information Technology Research and Development (NITRD) Program – which contains information about the Program and electronic versions of NITRD documents

== History and legal background ==
The Networking and Information Technology Research and Development (NITRD) Program (formerly known as High Performance Computing and Communications (HPCC) Program) was created by the High Performance Computing Act of 1991, (P.L. 102-194) and amended by the Next Generation Internet Research Act of 1998 (P.L. 105-305), and the America COMPETES (Creating Opportunities to Meaningfully Promote Excellence in Technology, Education, and Science) Act of 2007 (P.L. 110-69). NITRD was reauthorized by Congress in the American Innovation and Competitiveness Act of 2017 (P.L. 114-329).

Dr. Donald A.B. Lindberg was the founding Director of the National Coordination Office (NCO) for NITRD, formerly the NCO for High Performance Computing and Communications (HPCC). The High-Performance Computing Act of 1991 called for the coordination of activities in high-performance computing and the establishment of a National Research and Education Network (NREN) across Federal agencies. Dr. Lindberg led this effort from 1992 to 1995 while serving concurrently as the Director of the National Library of Medicine (NLM).

== Directors ==
Name	Dates	Notes
Donald A.B. Lindberg	September 1992 – March 1995	
John C. Toole	March 1995 – July 1997	
Sally E. Howe	July 1997 – December 1997	acting director
Kay Howell	December 1997 – September 2000	
Cita M. Furlani	October 2000 – November 2002	
David B. Nelson	December 2002 – April 2005	
Simon Szykman	May 2005 – January 2007	
Charles Romine	January 2007 – October 2007	acting director
Christopher L. Greer	October 2007 – September 2009	
Ernest L. McDuffie	September 2009 – November 2009	acting director
George O. Strawn	November 2009 – June 2015	
Keith Marzullo	June 2015 – July 2016	
Bryan Biegel	August 2016 – July 2018	
Kamie Roberts	August 2018 – October 2023	
Craig Schlenoff	October 2023 – October 2024	
A. Kirk Dohne	October 2024 – June 2025	

== Publications ==
- The Annual Supplement to the President's Budget, which is required by law, summarizes the program activities.
- National Artificial Intelligence Research and Development Strategic Plan 2023 Update (May 2023)
- National Strategy to Advance Privacy-Preserving Data Sharing and Analytics (March 2023)
- National Objectives for Digital Assets Research and Development (March 2023)
- Federal Cybersecurity Research and Development Strategic Plan (2019) (December 2019)
- The Federal Big Data Research and Development Strategic Plan (May 2016)
- Trustworthy Cyberspace: Strategic Plan for the Federal Cybersecurity Research and Development Program (December 2011)
- CSIA IWG Cybersecurity R&D Recommendations (May 2010)
- Harnessing the Power of Digital Data for Science and Society – Report of the Interagency Working Group on Digital Data to the Committee on Science of the National Science and Technology Council (January 2009)
- Federal Plan for Advanced Networking Research and Development (September 2008 )
- Federal Plan for Cyber Security and Information Assurance Research and Development (April 2006)
- Federal Plan for High-End Computing (Second Printing – July 2004)
- Five-Year Strategic Plan for FY 2002-FY 2006
