= Czech Institute of Informatics, Robotics and Cybernetics =

Czech research institute

- Český institut informatiky, robotiky a kybernetiky
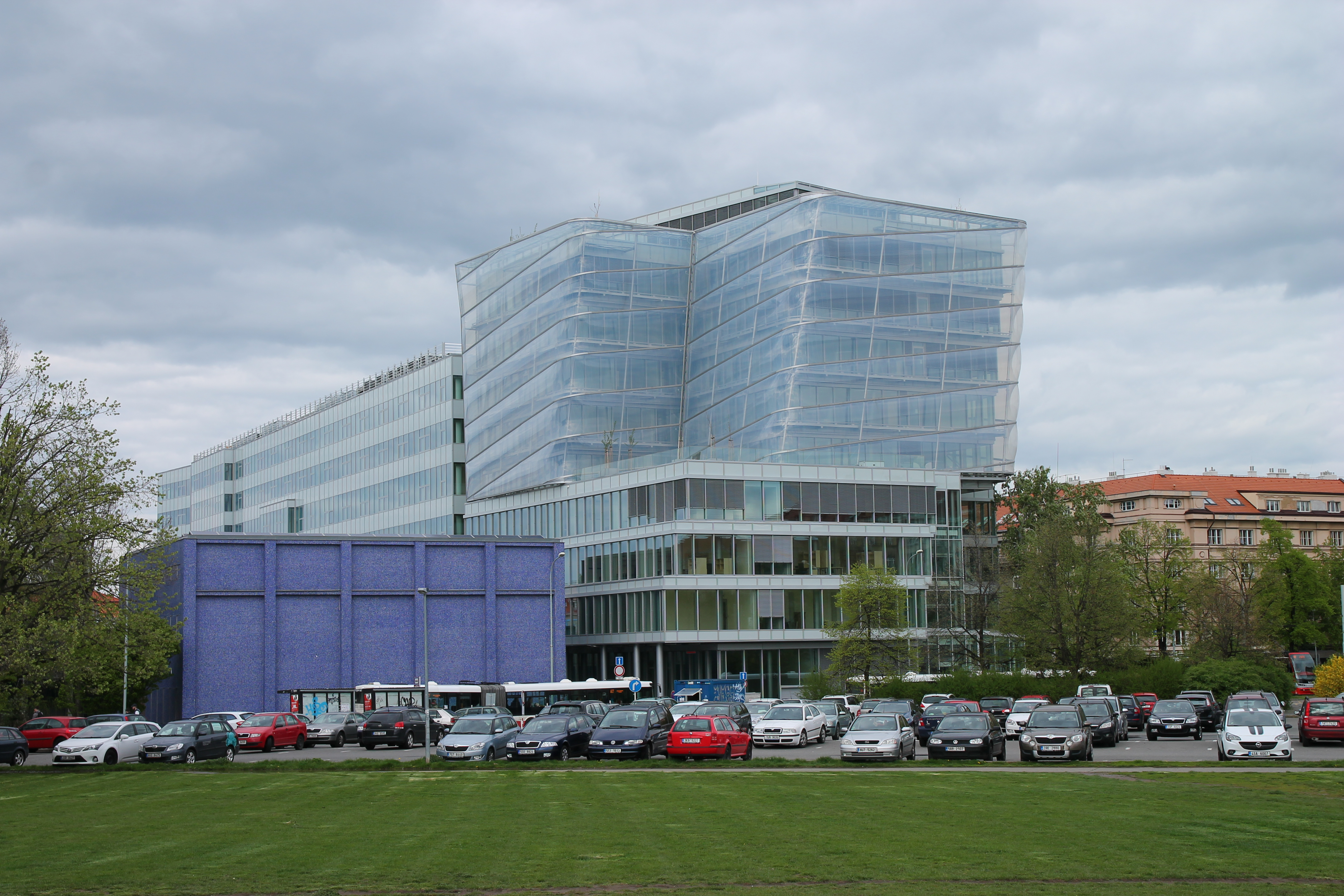
- CIIRC building in Dejvice
- Type: Research institute
- Established: 1 July 2013
- Parent institution: Czech Technical University in Prague
- Budget: CZK 355 million (2025)
- Director: Ondřej Velek
- Total staff: More than 300 (2026)
- Location: Prague, Czech Republic; 50°6′13.68″N 14°23′40.2″E
- Website: www.ciirc.cvut.cz

The Czech Institute of Informatics, Robotics and Cybernetics (Czech: Český institut informatiky, robotiky a kybernetiky, CIIRC) is a research institute of the Czech Technical University in Prague, based in Dejvice. Founded in 2013, it conducts research in artificial intelligence, robotics, computer vision, automatic control and optimisation.

== Research ==
In robotics, CIIRC researchers study how robots perceive their surroundings and learn to handle objects and use tools. A team led by Josef Šivic has developed methods that allow robots to learn movements from videos of human actions. For the WLTR bricklaying robot, CIIRC developed software to plan movements and handle bricks. Wienerberger and KM Robotics were its partners in the project, which placed second in the 2024 euRobotics Technology Transfer Award.

Research in automatic control and optimisation addresses the operation of complex systems, production planning and energy efficiency. Through the ROBOPROX programme, CIIRC works with other Czech universities on autonomous robots, production scheduling and ways for people and robots to share tasks.

A student team led by Jan Šedivý developed the Alquist chatbot at CIIRC. It won the Alexa Prize SocialBot competition in 2021. CIIRC researchers also helped develop DreaMS with colleagues at the Institute of Organic Chemistry and Biochemistry in Prague. The model uses machine learning to analyse tandem mass spectra.

In 2025, researchers from CIIRC and CTU's Faculty of Electrical Engineering developed AlquistCoder, an AI coding assistant designed to reduce security vulnerabilities in generated code. The team finished second among defending teams in the Amazon Nova AI Challenge.

== International cooperation ==
CIIRC hosts the Research and Innovation Centre on Advanced Industrial Production (RICAIP), established with CEITEC at Brno University of Technology, the German Research Center for Artificial Intelligence (DFKI), and the Center for Mechatronics and Automation Technology (ZeMA). RICAIP’s experimental facilities are located in Prague, Brno and Saarbrücken. Its research includes the remote control of manufacturing processes.

CIIRC leads the Czech part of AI-MATTERS, a European programme through which companies can test AI and robotics technologies for manufacturing. The Czech facilities are based at CIIRC in Prague, CEITEC in Brno and VSB – Technical University of Ostrava.

ELLIS Unit Prague is based at CIIRC. It was announced in 2019 as one of the first units of the European Laboratory for Learning and Intelligent Systems, a network for research in artificial intelligence.

In September 2026, the Korea–Czech Advanced Robotics Center opened at CIIRC’s Prague testbed. The centre was established for Czech and South Korean researchers to develop and test robotics technologies for use in factories. The South Korean partners include the Korea Institute for Robot Industry Advancement (KIRIA) and the Korea Electronics Technology Institute (KETI).

== Industry collaboration ==
The National Centre for Industry 4.0 was established at CIIRC in 2017. Its founding partners are Siemens, Škoda Auto and Brno University of Technology. At CIIRC’s Prague testbed, researchers and companies develop industrial robots, automated production systems and digital twins.

=== Manufacturing technologies ===
For LEGO’s factory in Kladno, CIIRC developed a machine-learning system that adjusts vibrating feeders on packaging lines. The feeders separate and dispense bricks so that each package contains the correct number. The system automates adjustments previously made by operators.

CIIRC also worked with industrial automation company Blumenbecker on the design and virtual commissioning of robotic production lines. CIIRC developed software to optimise the timing of robot operations, shortening production cycles and reducing electricity use. Blumenbecker used it to design several robotic production lines later installed at customers’ factories. The joint project received the Czech Confederation of Industry’s Industry 4.0 Award in 2020.

With AUMOVIO, CIIRC developed a digital twin incorporating simulated cameras and production controls. The researchers modelled a robotic cell at AUMOVIO’s factory in Brandýs nad Labem. They used the model to test camera algorithms and production controls without building a new line.

=== Automotive research ===
The institute runs the Automotive R&D 4.0 laboratory with Škoda Auto and CTU’s Faculty of Transportation Sciences. Its work includes developing vehicle interfaces and prototypes and testing them with users in driving simulators.
