= United States Coast Guard Research & Development Center =

U.S. government agency

Coordinates: 41.3167°N 72.0637°W

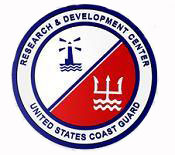
Seal

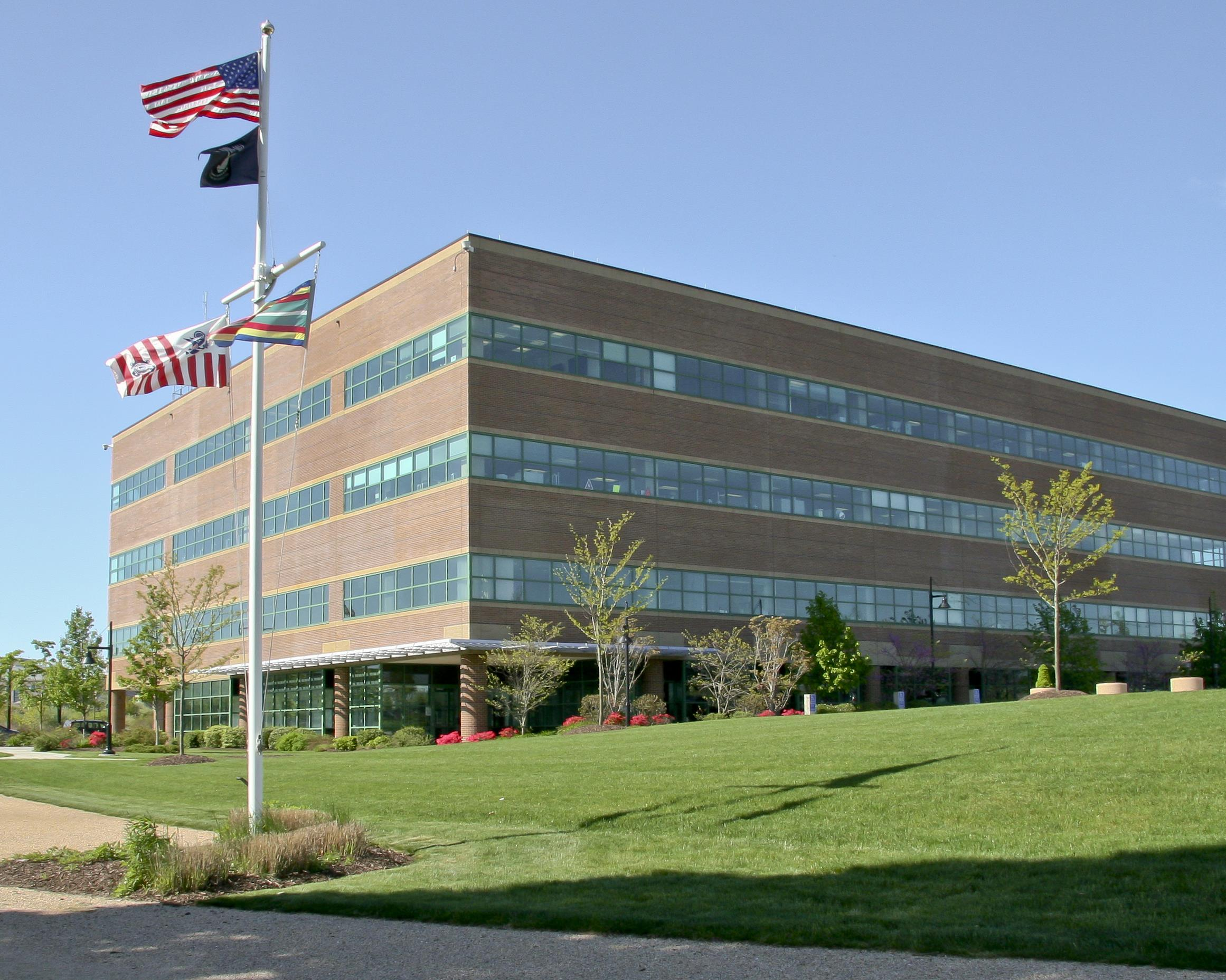
Building

The United States Coast Guard Research & Development Center (CG RDC) located in New London, Connecticut is the Coast Guard's center for operational analysis and mission execution solutions. The Research & Development Center is dedicated to maximizing its contribution by maintaining a balanced portfolio of projects that support the Coast Guard's short, medium, and long range requirements across all major missions. It is the Coast Guard's sole facility performing research, development, test and evaluation (RDT&E) in support of the Coast Guard's major mission areas of; Environmental Protection, Maritime Law Enforcement, Protection of Life and Property at Sea and National Defense Preparedness. The R& D Center's technology research includes: detection, interdiction and prosecution of drug smugglers; cleaning up oil spills; maritime navigation safety; alertness and performance of commercial and CG crews; eliminating invasive species for ship ballast water. It is located in the Fort Trumbull section of New London at 1 Chelsea St.
