= National research and development agency (Japan) =

Research and development agency established by the Japanese state

The national research and development agency (Japanese: 国立研究開発法人) is a type of organizations established by the Japanese government and managed by the Ministry of Education, Culture, Sports, Science and Technology.

== List ==
1. National Institute for Materials Science (NIMS)
2. RIKEN
3. National Institute of Advanced Industrial Science and Technology (AIST) and National Metrology Institute of Japan (NMIJ)
4. Japan Aerospace Exploration Agency (JAXA)
5. National Institutes for Quantum Science and Technology (QST)
6. National Institute of Genetics (NIG)
7. National Institute for Basic Biology (NIBB)
8. National Institute of Informatics (NII)
9. National Institute of Public Health (NIPH)
10. National Center for Global Health and Medicine (NCGM)
11. National Cancer Center (NCC)
12. National Institute of Information and Communications Technology (NICT)
13. National Institute of Infectious Diseases (NIID)
14. National Institute for Defense Studies (NIDS)
15. National Institute of Science and Technology Policy (NISTEP)
16. National Institutes of Biomedical Innovation, Health and Nutrition (NIBIOHN)

== See also ==
- Independent Administrative Institution
