= STPI (disambiguation) =

STPI is short for Software Technology Parks of India.

STPI may also refer to:

- Science and Technology Policy Institute, Washington, D.C., US
- Society for Threatened Peoples International, Göttingen, Germany
- STPI - Creative Workshop & Gallery, Singapore
