= Mitre Corporation =

American not-for-profit corporation

The MITRE Corporation
- Type: 501(c)(3) not-for-profit corporation
- Founded: 1958; 68 years ago
- Headquarters: Bedford, Massachusetts and McLean, Virginia, United States
- Key people: Mark Peters (President and Chief executive officer); Rodney E. Slater (Chairman)
- Revenue: ▲US$2.37 billion (2023)
- Total assets: 558,250,000 United States dollar (2011)
- Number of employees: ▲9,000+ (2022)
- Website: www.mitre.org

The Mitre Corporation (stylized as The MITRE Corporation and MITRE) is an American not-for-profit organization with dual headquarters in Bedford, Massachusetts, and McLean, Virginia. It manages federally funded research and development centers (FFRDCs) supporting various U.S. government agencies in the aviation, defense, healthcare, homeland security, and cybersecurity fields, among others.

MITRE formed in 1958 as a military think tank, spun out from the radar and computer research at the MIT Lincoln Laboratory. Over the years, MITRE's field of study has greatly diversified. In the 1990s, with the winding down of the Cold War, private companies complained that MITRE had an unfair advantage competing for civilian contracts; in 1996 this led to the civilian projects being spun off to a new company, Mitretek. Mitretek was renamed Noblis in 2007.

== Etymology ==
The name MITRE was created by James McCormack Jr., one of the original board members. The name is not an acronym, although various claims that it is can be found online. Originally always seen in upper case, MITRE began using normal capitalization around the time of the Mitretek spinoff, but both forms can still be widely found as of 2023.

In 2023, Simson Garfinkel for MIT Technology Review studied hundreds of archival documents and could not determine the origin of MITRE’s name. Howard Murphy, a historian at the State University of New York at Oneonta, was quoted in Technology Review as saying that the company’s incorporators chose the name “MITRE” because it was the French spelling of the American English word “miter,” a smooth joining of two pieces.

== History ==
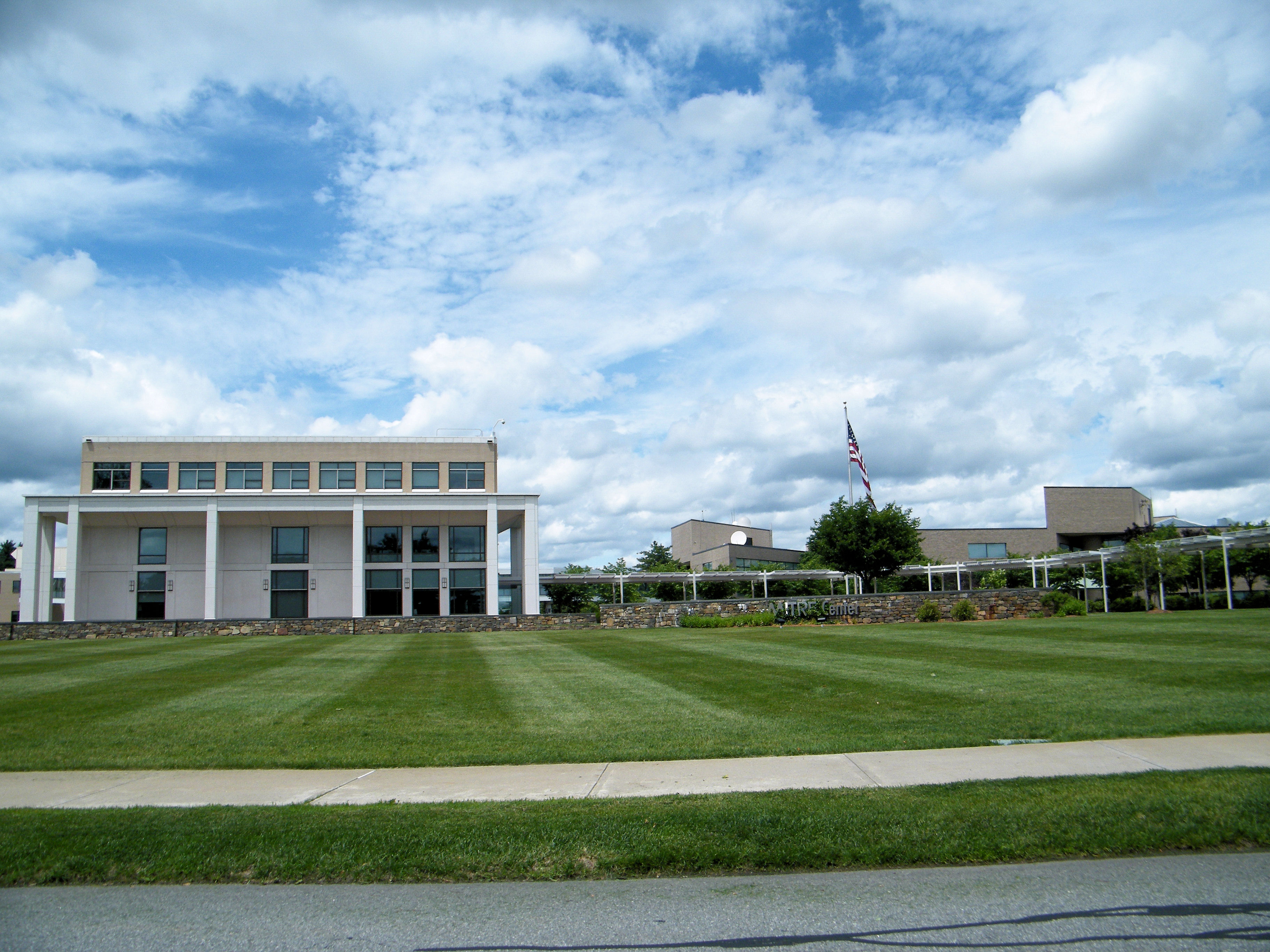
The MITRE Center in Bedford, Massachusetts, in 2009

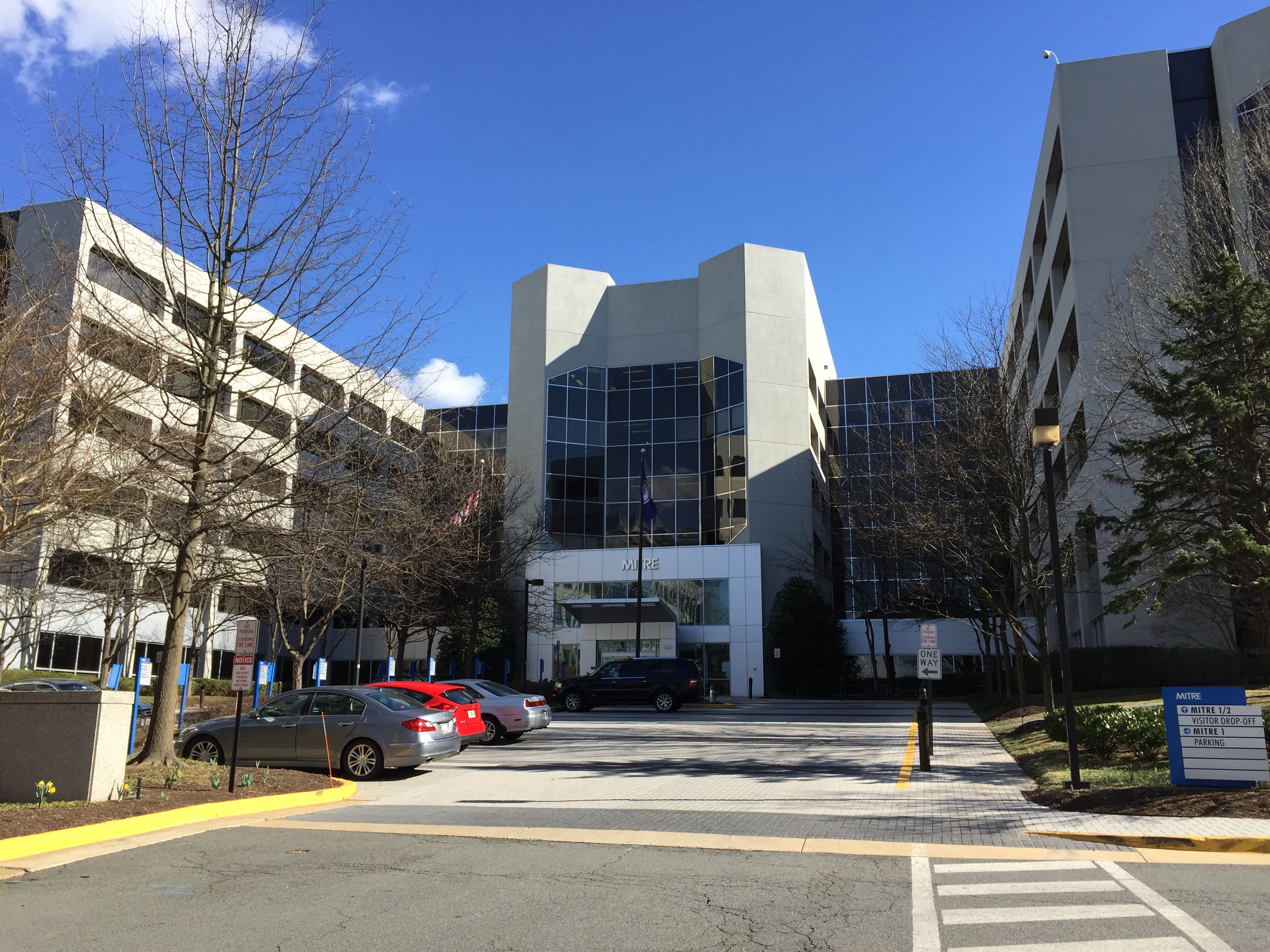
MITRE offices in McLean, Virginia, in 2017; the company has had a presence in McLean since 1963.

MITRE was founded in Bedford, Massachusetts in 1958, spun off from the MIT Lincoln Laboratory. MITRE's first employees had been developing the Semi-Automatic Ground Environment (SAGE) system and aerospace defense as part of Lincoln Labs Division 6. They were specifically engaged in MIT's research and engineering of the project.

MITRE's early leadership has been described as "a mix of men" affiliated with the Ford Foundation, the Institute for Defense Analyses, RAND Corporation, System Development Corporation (SDC), and the United States Armed Forces, including Horace Rowan Gaither, James Rhyne Killian, James McCormack, and Julius Adams Stratton.

In April 1959, a site was purchased in Bedford, Massachusetts, near Hanscom Air Force Base, to develop a new MITRE laboratory, which MITRE occupied in September 1959. MITRE established an office in McLean in 1963, and had approximately 850 technical employees by 1967. MITRE registered the first .org domain on July 10, 1985, which continues to be used by the company. During the 1980s, the German hacker Markus Hess used an unsecured Mitre Tymnet connection as an entry point for intrusions into U.S. Department of Defense, Department of Energy, and NASA computer networks. By 1989, the company had thousands of employees in Bedford and McLean; approximately 3,000 employees in the "command, control, communications and intelligence" ("C3I") division oversaw military projects, while non-military projects were handled by the civilian METREK division, which had approximately 800 employees based in McLean.

In 1966, MITRE was one to the first companies to be part of the Dollars for Scholars program. At the beginning the students would go door-to-door for donations, then in 1985 it became a Phone-a-thon. MITRE hosted the Phone-a-thon from 1996 until 2020, where it then in 2021 and 2022 due to COVID-19 became a Mail-a-thon.

By the 1990s, MITRE had become a "multifaceted engineering company with a wide range of clients," according to Kathleen Day of The Washington Post. MITRE worked on neural network software, the long-distance telecommunications service FTS2000 for the General Services Administration, and a new computer system for the U.S. Securities and Exchange Commission. On January 29, 1996, Mitre divided into two entities: The MITRE Corporation, to focus on its FFRDCs for DoD and FAA; and a new company established in McLean, called Mitretek Systems until 2007 and now called Noblis, to assume non-FFRDC research work for other U.S. Government agencies.

== Organization ==
MITRE restructured its research and engineering operations in mid 2020, forming MITRE Labs. Approximately half of MITRE's employees work under the unit, which seeks to "further extend the parent organization's impact across federally-funded research-and-development centers and with partners in academia and industry".

In April 2025, MITRE announced plans to eliminate 442 positions following federal contract cancellations. CEO Mark Peters said the organization was shifting its focus toward operating federally funded research and development centers, and performing engineering work.

In August 2026, MITRE appointed Glenn Daly vice president of engineering and analysis to lead its new Center for Engineering and Analysis.

The nonprofit foundation MITRE Engenuity (or simply Engenuity) was launched in 2019 "to collaborate with the private sector on solving industrywide problems with cyber defense" in collaboration with corporate partners. The foundation created the Center for Threat-Informed Defense that has 23 member organizations with cybersecurity teams, as of 2020, including Fujitsu and Microsoft. In September 2020, Engenuity's Center for Threat-Informed Defense and partners launched the Adversary Emulation Library, a GitHub-hosted project providing downloadable emulation plans to network security groups at no cost. The library's first plan was focused on the prominent cybercrime group FIN6. MITRE had previously released emulation plans for the Chinese and Russian hacker groups Advanced Persistent Threat (APT) 3 and APT29 in 2017 and 2020, respectively. In March 2021, Engenuity created the MITRE ATT&CK Defender training program to educate and certify cybersecurity professionals.

=== Federally funded research and development centers (FFRDCs) ===
MITRE manages six FFRDCs. The National Security Engineering Center, previously known as the C3I Federally Funded Research and Development Center until 2011, addresses national security issues for the Department of Defense.

In September 2020, the U.S. Air Force awarded a $463 million contract to continue work for the National Security Engineering Center (NSEC), an FFRDC supporting the Department of Defense and Intelligence Community. The one-year contract provided cybersecurity, electronics, information technology, sensors, and systems engineering services in Bedford and McLean. In August 2025, the Air Force awarded MITRE a $583.9 million continuation contract for its administration of NSEC through September 2026.

MITRE's Center for Advanced Aviation System Development (CAASD) supports the FAA, an agency within the Department of Transportation.

The organization's Center for Enterprise Modernization, which focuses on enterprise modernization, was established as the IRS Federally Funded Research and Development Center in 1998, before being renamed in August 2001. Originally sponsored by the Internal Revenue Service (a bureau of the Department of the Treasury), the Department of Veterans Affairs joined as a co-sponsor in 2008, and the Social Security Administration joined as a co-sponsor in 2018.

MITRE's Homeland Security Systems Engineering and Development Institute (HSSEDI) completes work for the Department of Homeland Security, such as maintaining the federal executive department's list of the 25 most common software bugs. The HSSEDI was established in 2009, following passage of the Homeland Security Act of 2002, and along with the Homeland Security Studies and Analysis Institute replaced the Homeland Security Institute.

MITRE's CMS Alliance to Modernize Healthcare was established in 2012 as the Centers for Medicare and Medicaid Services Federally Funded Research and Development Center, also known as the Health FFRDC. The FFRDC is sponsored by the Centers for Medicare & Medicaid Services, an agency within the Department of Health and Human Services.

MITRE has managed the National Cybersecurity FFRDC since 2014, following receipt of a "single indefinite-delivery, indefinite-quantity" $5 billion contract from the National Institute of Standards and Technology (NIST) for a research center dedicated to cybersecurity. MITRE will support NIST's work "related to cybersecurity solutions composed of commercial components and the integration of technology to build trustworthy information systems for government agencies". In October 2024, NIST renewed MITRE's contract to operate the National Cybersecurity FFRDC, extending the arrangement through 2029. In December 2025, NIST awarded MITRE $20 million to establish two AI Economic Security Ceners focused on manufacturing productivity and cybersecurity for critical infrastructure.

Currently, MITRE holds the contract to administer and provide management to JASON, an advisory group for the federal government made up of scientists.

=== Policy ===
MITRE's Center for Data-Driven Policy, established in 2020, seeks to "provide evidence-based, objective and nonpartisan insights for government policymaking".

The Center for Technology & National Security, now part of the Center for Data-Driven Policy, was created to link MITRE "with senior government officials for research and development purposes". Members of the advisory board include John F. Campbell, Lisa Disbrow, William E. Gortney, Robert B. Murrett, and Robert O. Work, as of mid 2020.

== Projects ==
=== National security ===
U.S. military forces, especially the Air Force, were primary initial sponsors; according to Air Force Magazine, MITRE was created "as a special-purpose technical not-for-profit firm to perform the SAGE systems-engineering job". The aerial warfare service branch had struggled to identify a for-profit corporation to develop the defense system, so MITRE was hired to serve as the system engineer. MITRE subsequently designed air defense systems for the U.S. and allies, improving aircraft and missile tracking as well as communication interception abilities. The company also helped design the Cheyenne Mountain Complex facility in Colorado operating the North American Air Defense system. In the 1970s, MITRE continued supporting military projects such as AWACS and the Joint Tactical Information Distribution System and "[helping] civil agencies develop information systems for transportation, medicine, law enforcement, space exploration and environmental cleanup."

MITRE has completed software engineering work for the Distributed Common Ground System and helped the North Atlantic Treaty Organization create intelligence, surveillance and reconnaissance (ISR) data standards. The company also worked with the Multi-Sensor Aerospace-Ground Joint ISR Interoperability Coalition to ensure proper formatting for ISR sensor data. In 2018, MITRE developed the "Deliver Uncompromised" strategy for the Department of Defense, proposing recommendations for supply chain security. MITRE and the Air Force Association's Mitchell Institute published a report in 2019 recommending improved technologies for the U.S. nuclear command, control and communications (NC3) network and warning that some of the system's early satellites are "vulnerable to electronic attacks and interference". The firm also published a government-mandated report with recommendations for the Air Force's inventory in 2030. The Department of Veterans Affairs hired MITRE to provide recommendation for implementation and program integration of the Forever GI Bill.

MITRE has also focused on the great power competition; in 2020, the company published a paper about 5G networks and competition between China and the U.S.

In 2025, MITRE participated with NVIDIA, Cisco, ODC, and other organizations in developing an AI-native wireless architecture for 6G, contributing an application that uses artificial intelligence to allocate wireless spectrum in real time. In September 2025, MITRE and the Department of Defense's Operational Energy-Innovation Directorate developed the Transition Maturity Framework, a methodology for assessing technology readiness and managing the transition of research and development projects toward operational use.

=== Airspace, Global Positioning System (GPS), and aerospace ===
In addition to military work, MITRE's early projects included air traffic control improvements for the Federal Aviation Administration (FAA). During the 1980s, MITRE helped modernize the Air Force's airborne early warning and control system and improve the Milstar constellation of communications satellites. The company also worked on a major overhaul of the FAA's traffic control system as well as sensor technology for tracking stealth aircraft. In 1997, MITRE sponsored a research program related to Global Positioning System (GPS) adaptive nulling antennas. MITRE also provided global navigation satellite system signal generation equipment for testing at the United States Army's White Sands Missile Range. The Air Force Research Laboratory's geosynchronous satellite Navigation Technology Satellite-3 will use MITRE's Global Navigation Satellite System Test Architecture to "implement user equipment capability".

MITRE has worked on the traffic collision avoidance system of the Next Generation Air Transportation System (NextGen), a modernization project of the National Airspace System (NAS). MITRE's Integrated Demonstration and Experimentation for Aeronautics (IDEA) Lab has assessed the impact of new technologies for the FAA since 1992. In addition to air traffic management and aviation regulations, the group has worked on merging unmanned aerial vehicle operations into the NAS as well as defining how the system will function in 2035, a decade after the scheduled implementation of NextGen.

MITRE has explored the use of mobile devices for communicating instrument flight rules, specifically clearances at airports lacking Pre-Departure Clearance/Data Comm Clearance. The company's Pacer web application uses System Wide Information Management and Traffic Flow Management System data as well as airline and general aviation departure schedules to "improve the way that general aviation operators file for and obtain departure clearances".

MITRE has also completed air traffic control and safety work for the Civil Aviation Authority of Singapore (CAAS). The company's Singapore-based unit was hired by CAAS to consider how artificial intelligence, machine learning, and speech recognition could be used to improve air traffic management systems. Among MITRE's innovations was a "speech recognition prototype that will automate and shorten the transcription process during an aviation incident investigation".

MITRE and the Naval Research Laboratory developed the Frequency-scaled Ultra-wide Spectrum Element (FUSE) antenna to increase the data transfer speed between ground users and satellites. Meshbed, a CubeSat launched into orbit by the Indian Space Research Organisation's Polar Satellite Launch Vehicle in November 2019, will test the antenna's effectiveness. MITRE has received three patents for the antenna.

Beginning in 2022, MITRE developed guidance for airport responses to GPS disruptions through the Aviation Cyber Initiative, testing and refining the approach with Dallas Fort Worth International Airport and stakeholders in Tampa. The resulting best practices guidance was subsequently published by the FAA as an airport resource.

=== Cybersecurity and election integrity ===
The MITRE ATT&CK framework, launched in 2015, has been described by Computer Weekly as "the free, globally accessible service that offers comprehensive and current cyber security threat information" to organizations, and by TechTarget as a "global knowledge base of threat activity, techniques and models". The framework has been used by the Cybersecurity and Infrastructure Security Agency and the FBI. Version 14.1 was released in October 2023. By April 2026, ATT&CK version 19 had been released, followed by 19.2 in August 2026. According to a 2020 study published by the University of California, Berkeley and security software company McAfee, 80 percent of companies use the framework for cybersecurity.

The Structured Threat Information eXchange (STIX), described as a "machine-to-machine cyber threat information-sharing language", was developed by MITRE and the Department of Homeland Security. The program facilitates information sharing between industry, critical infrastructure operators and government in order to blunt cyberattacks" and allows participants to share data via the Trusted Automated eXchange of Indicator Information (TAXII). Program governance was granted to the global nonprofit consortium OASIS in 2015, and STIX 2.0 was approved in 2017.

Microsoft and MITRE partnered on the open source Adversarial Machine Learning Threat Matrix in collaboration with IBM, Nvidia, and academic institutions. Launched in October 2020, the framework is "designed to organize and catalogue known techniques for attacks against machine-learning systems, to inform security analysts and provide them with strategies to detect, respond and remediate against threats".

In February 2020, MITRE launched SQUINT, a free app allowing election officials to report misinformation on social media; the app was being used by eleven U.S. states, as of October 2020. The company also established the National Election Security Lab, offering free risk assessments for voting systems.

Other projects include the Common Vulnerabilities and Exposures (CVE) database of vulnerabilities and exposures related to information security and the Common Weakness Enumeration (CWE) category system for software weaknesses and vulnerabilities. In April 2025, the Cybersecurity and Infrastructure Security Agency (CISA) exercised an 11-month contract option extending MITRE's operation of the CVE program after concerns that the existing contract would expire. In August 2026, CISA awarded MITRE approximately $11.8 million for further work on the CVE and CWE programs, with the contract schedules to run to August 2027.

MITRE tests automation and deployment of new security tools to augment critical infrastructure security in its Cyber Infrastructure Protection Innovation Center. The lab includes a model city, with a hospital, rail station, chemical plant, downtown area, and neighborhood that acts as a test bed to run attack simulations.

In early 2022, MITRE launched MITRE Engage, a framework that cyber defenders use for communicating and planning cyber adversary engagement, deception, and denial activities. The project earned a CSO 50 award for security innovation and a Global InfoSec award from Cyber Defense Magazine as the market leader for deception-based security^{.}

In early 2024, MITRE disclosed that its Networked Experimentation, Research, and Virtualization Environment (NERVE) had been compromised between January and April through the exploitation of chained zero-day vulnerabilities in Ivanti Connect Secure appliances. The breach was contained to the NERVE research network and did not affect MITRE's enterprise network. In April 2024, MITRE published details of its forensic analysis and security response.

In January 2026, MITRE launched the Embedded Systems Threat Matrix (ESTM), a cybersecurity framework categorizing attack tactics and techniques affecting hardware and firmware environments. Also in 2026, MITRE released the Fight Fraud Framwork (MITRE F3), a behavior-based knowledge system describing tactics and techniques used in cyber-enabled fraud.

=== Government innovation ===
MITRE has researched cloud computing policy, helped the U.S. federal government identify fraudulent comments intended to "spoof" public support for non-existent positions during the rulemaking process, and increased the Pennsylvania Department of Revenue's delinquent taxpayer compliance rate.

In May 2024, MITRE announced plans for a Federal AI Sandbox to provide federal agencies with computing infrastructure for prototyping and testing artificial intelligence applications. The planned environment was to use NVIDIA AI datacenter infrastructure, with agencies able to access it through existing contracts with MITRE-operated FFRDCs.

=== Health and Human Services ===
MITRE conducts research and development to solve complex health issues ranging from preventing chronic disease to accelerating health research, improving healthcare quality, and expanding health coverage.

During the 1980s, MITRE worked on a digital radiological imaging project for MedStar Georgetown University Hospital and an upgrade to MEDLINE for the National Institutes of Health.

In 2003, the Department of Health and Human Services (HHS) commissioned MITRE to expand on work in cybersecurity and enterprise architectures to benefit healthcare systems.

The Centers for Medicare & Medicaid Services (CMS) competitively selected MITRE to operate the CMS Alliance to Modernize Healthcare federally funded research and development center (Health FFRDC) in 2012 on behalf of sponsoring agencies across HHS.

In 2015, MITRE managed an assessment and reports for the VA Choice Act, which improves healthcare access and options for our nation’s veterans.

MITRE launched research in 2017 that created Synthea, a Synthetic Patient Population Simulation that is used to generate realistic (but not real) patient data and associated health records in a variety of formats. Synthea, MITRE's open source synthetic data system, "mirrors real population information in terms of demographics, disease burden, vaccinations, medical visits and social determinants", and seeks to "mimic how each patient progresses from birth to death through modular representations of various diseases and conditions". MITRE's patient data set SyntheticMass, based on "fictional" Massachusetts residents, was formatted by Fast Healthcare Interoperability Resources and made available to developers via Google Cloud in 2019.

In 2023, CMS awarded MITRE a new five-year contract to operate the Health FFRDC.

==== mCODE ====
In 2019, MITRE and partners in the private sector released mCODE™, a core set of elements for capturing data in a standardized format in the electronic record of cancer patients to improve treatment, care coordination, and research efforts. In this effort to combat chronic diseases such as cancer, MITRE collaborates with organizations such as Mayo Clinic, Microsoft, and the American Society of Clinical Oncology to improve prevention and care for the millions of Americans living with cancer. MCode serves as both a common language and a model, helping facilitate a comprehensive approach to patient care and aiding research by enabling study of data throughout a cancer patient's experience and among different groups of patients. . More than 70 organizations implemented mCode by 2024.

==== COVID-19 ====
In March 2020, during the COVID-19 pandemic, MITRE published a white paper claiming the number of confirmed and reported COVID-19 cases "significantly underrepresent the actual number of active domestic COVID-19 infections" in the United States. MITRE said the gap was because of "limited testing capability and the multi-day period of asymptomatic infectivity associated with the COVID-19 pathogen". MITRE managed the Coronavirus Commission on Safety and Quality in Nursing Homes, announced by the Donald Trump administration in June 2020, to "independently and comprehensively assess" responses to the pandemic and "offer actionable recommendations to inform future responses to infectious disease outbreaks within nursing homes".

The Centers for Disease Control and Prevention (CDC) funded a $16.5 million MITRE-led project to create an enduring open source tool called Sara Alert, for monitoring symptoms of Americans exposed to COVID-19. MITRE developed the free tool in collaboration with multiple national public health organizations as well as local and state health agencies. In April 2020, Sara Alert launched in Arkansas and was being tested in Danbury, Connecticut as well as the Northern Mariana Islands, with data being maintained by the Association of Public Health Laboratories. Sara Alert was being used in Idaho, Maine, Pennsylvania, and Virginia by the end of May, and Guam by October. Since January 2021, MITRE has co-lead a coalition known as the Vaccination Credential Initiative (VCI), which is composed of over 300 technology and healthcare organizations developing a technical standard for verifying vaccination and other clinical information.

== Corporate governance ==
=== Leadership ===
Clair William Halligan, an electrical engineer, served as MITRE's first president until 1966, when he became chairman of the company's executive committee. He retired in 1968. John L. McLucas succeeded Halligan as president. Robert Everett served as president from 1969 to 1986. Subsequent holders of the president and chief executive officer (CEO) role included Charles A. Zraket (1986–1990), Barry Horowitz (1990–1996), Victor A. DeMarines (1996–2000), Martin C. Faga (2000–2006), Alfred Grasso (2006–2017), and Jason Providakes (2017–2024). On 3 September 2024, Mark Peters became the MITRE's tenth president and CEO. In April 2025, Brian Abrahmson was appointed senior vice president and chief operating officer.

Jay Schnitzer serves as chief technology officer and chief medical officer. He is leading a national effort to combat COVID-19 on behalf of MITRE and 50 partner companies, health care providers, and researchers, as of March 2020. MITRE named Charles Clancy its first chief futurist in 2020 and restructured to create MITRE Labs.

As of September 2026, trustees include Rodney E. Slater (chairman), Sue Gordon (vice chair), Maury W. Bradsher, Richard Clark, Richard D. Clarke, Lance Collins, Michael Huerta, Chris Inglis, Yvette Meléndez, Mark Peters (CEO), Adalio T. Sanchez, Jan E. Tighe, Jonathan Moneymaker, and Samantha F. Ravich.

== Partnerships ==
The Alliance for Clinical Trials in Oncology, American Society of Clinical Oncology, and MITRE partnered on the 'mCODE Initiative' to recommend data standards for cancer patients' electronic health records. MITRE supports the Homeland Security Experts Group, which has been described as "an independent, nonpartisan group of homeland security and counterterrorism experts that educates the public and government leaders, including the secretary of homeland security".

MITRE became a founding member of the Space Information Sharing and Analysis Center, a cybersecurity project for the space industry, in 2019. MITRE and partners such as Harvard Innovation Labs and MassChallenge launched Bridging Innovation in 2020 to connect government agencies and startup companies. MITRE is a member of the COVID-19 Healthcare Coalition, which is co-chaired by Jay Schnitzer. In June 2020, the coalition launched the COVID-19 Decision Support Dashboard, which uses public data to assess transmission trends and display color-coded indicators based on performance by jurisdiction. MITRE is also part of the Fight Is In Us coalition, a collaborative effort between advocates, companies, and government officials to promote plasma donation for patient treatment during the COVID-19 pandemic.

=== Challenges ===
MITRE's Countering Unmanned Aircraft Systems Challenge in 2016 invited applicants to "demonstrate systems that detect and stop drones weighing less than five pounds that present a safety or security risk". The company's Unique Identification of Internet of Things (IoT) Devices Challenge tasked applicants with improving security for connected devices. In 2020, MITRE participated in the National Institute of Standards and Technology's Too Close for Too Long Challenge to "help evaluate and potentially improve upon that baseline Bluetooth performance for helping detect when smartphone users are standing too close to one another".

== Locations ==
In addition to the headquarter campuses in Bedford and McLean, MITRE has more than 60 other locations throughout the United States and around the world. In New Jersey, two offices house approximately 60 employees, as of September 2020. Up to 70 percent of employees may continue working remotely, even after restrictions associated with the COVID-19 pandemic have been lifted.

MITRE's data center in Bedford, originally built during the 1980s and known as the High Performance Computing Center since 2015, was retrofitted with a refrigerant-based cooling system, resulting in lower operating costs and a higher compute capacity. In 2023, a large underground marine equipment testing tank opened on the Bedford campus. The company's McLean campus houses the Integrated Demonstration and Experimentation for Aeronautics (IDEA) Lab, as well as the Mobile Autonomous Systems Experimentation lab, which focuses on self-driving cars. MITRE's laboratory in Singapore, called Mitre Asia Pacific Singapore (MAPS) assesses and displays "various safety and air traffic concepts in preparation for the future".

== Recognition ==
In June 2008, MITRE was presented with the Secretary of Defense Medal for Outstanding Public Service for "significant contributions in communications, command and control decision-making, intelligence, cyberspace, and warfighter field support, as well as research and development".

In 2026, the MITRE ATT&CK framework and its developers received an IEEE Cybersecurity Award for Practice for contributions to the framework's development and adoption.
