= Jason Providakes =

American national security expert

- Education: Worcester Polytechnic Institute, Cornell University

Jason Providakes is an American national security expert. He was the president and CEO of the Mitre Corporation from 2017 to 2024.

== Early life ==
Jason Providakes earned his undergraduate and master's degrees in electrical engineering from Worcester Polytechnic Institute. After earning his PhD from Cornell University's School of Electrical and Computer Engineering in 1985, Providakes taught at the university and conducted research in radar backscatter, a method used to study the ionosphere.

== Career ==
Providakes began his career at Mitre Corporation in 1991 as a lead scientist, where he continued his research into the ionosphere and used it to help create a radar system that could detect aircraft over the horizon.

He has held leadership positions on major efforts to modernize U.S. government infrastructure and create new capabilities for national security, public health, veteran’s services, and other applications. As a senior vice president for Mitre's Center for Connected Government, Providakes testified during a 2013 hearing before the House Committee on Oversight and Government Reform regarding Mitre's assessment of issues with the HealthCare.gov website.

In February 2017, Providakes was appointed as Mitre's president and CEO, leading defense, cybersecurity, healthcare, and guides the company’s stewardship of federally funded research and development centers. Under Providakes’s leadership, Mitre has created new organizations including Mitre Labs, which reorganized the company’s research and development operations and talent into a single unit; the Center for Data-Driven Policy, which provides “evidence-based, objective and nonpartisan insights for government policymaking;” and the Center for Strategic Competition, which applies data analysis and simulations to tackle changing worldwide partnerships.
