= Mary Lynn Reed =

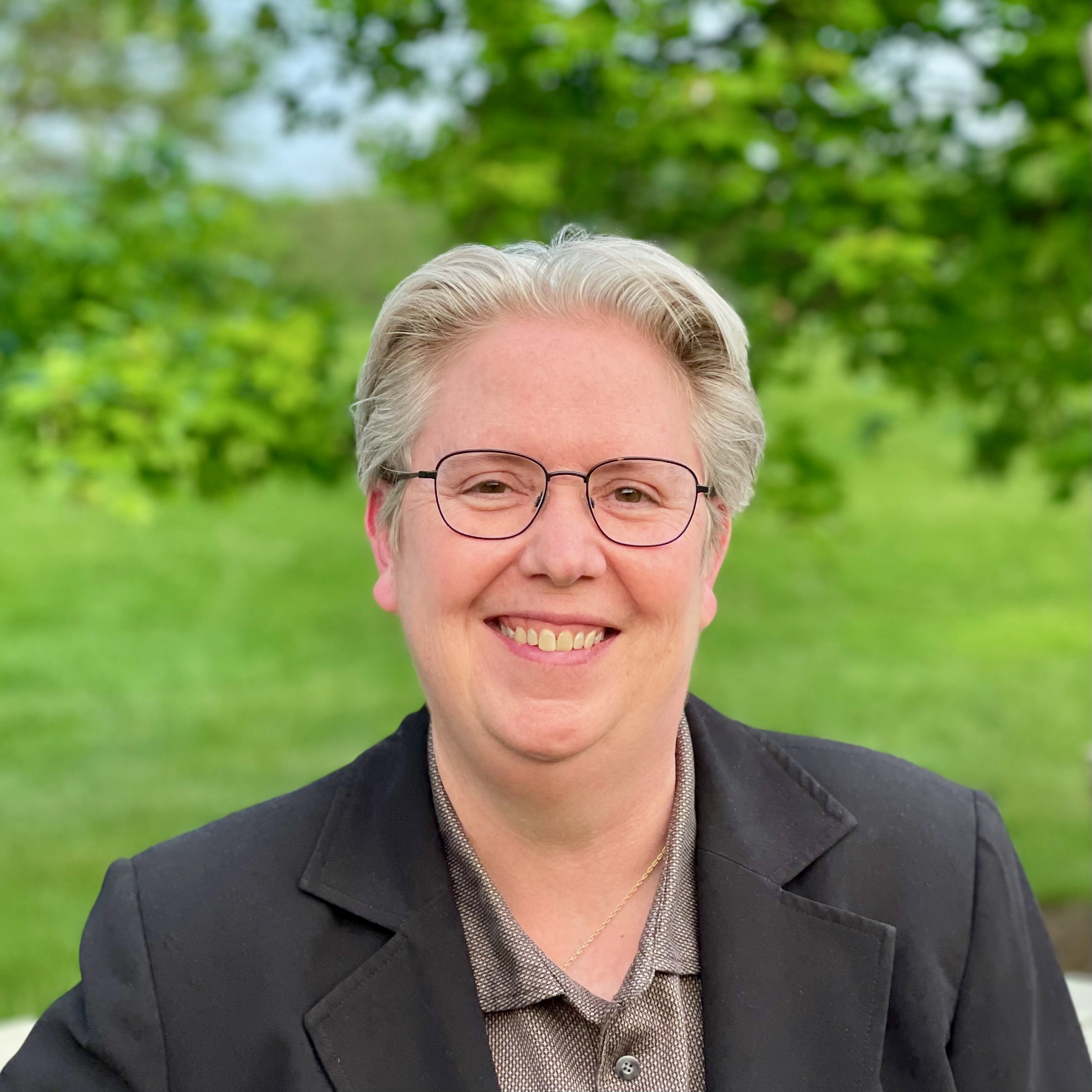
- Mary Lynn Reed in 2023
- Born: 1967 (age 58–59)
- Education: University of Illinois Urbana-Champaign
- Scientific career
- Fields: Mathematics
- Workplaces: National Security Agency, Institute for Defense Analyses, Rochester Institute of Technology
- Doctoral advisor: William Haboush

Mary Lynn Reed (born 1967) is an American mathematician, intelligence researcher, professor, and short fiction writer. She served as the Department Head in the School of Mathematical Sciences at the Rochester Institute of Technology (RIT) from 2019 to 2022. She is currently a professor of Mathematics at RIT.

== Education ==
Reed is a 1988 graduate of the Georgia Institute of Technology. She earned a Ph.D. in mathematics in 1995 from the University of Illinois at Urbana–Champaign. Her dissertation, supervised by William Haboush, was The Frobenius Direct Image of Line Bundles and the Structure of Representations, and concerned representation theory.

Reed writes that she was "drawn to writing in one form or another since I was a child", but that she began submitting her creative writing for publication in approximately 2005. In 2013, she completed a Master of Fine Arts in creative writing at the University of Maryland, College Park. Her MFA thesis, Singularities, was directed by Maud Casey.

== Career ==
After completing her doctorate, Reed obtained a faculty position at the Philadelphia College of Pharmacy and Science, but "it was not her dream job", and she left to work at the IDA Center for Communications Research (CCR) in La Jolla and then in the software industry. She began working with the National Security Agency after the September 11 attacks in 2001. By 2016, she had become the chief of mathematics research at the agency. She has also been president of the Crypto-Mathematics Institute, an association of NSA mathematicians, and a member of the Board of Trustees of IDA.

In 2019, she moved to the Rochester Institute of Technology as Head of the School of Mathematical Sciences.

== Recognition ==
In 2018, the University of Illinois Department of Mathematics Alumni gave Reed their Outstanding Professional Achievement Award.
