= Institute for Defense Analyses =

American non-profit corporation

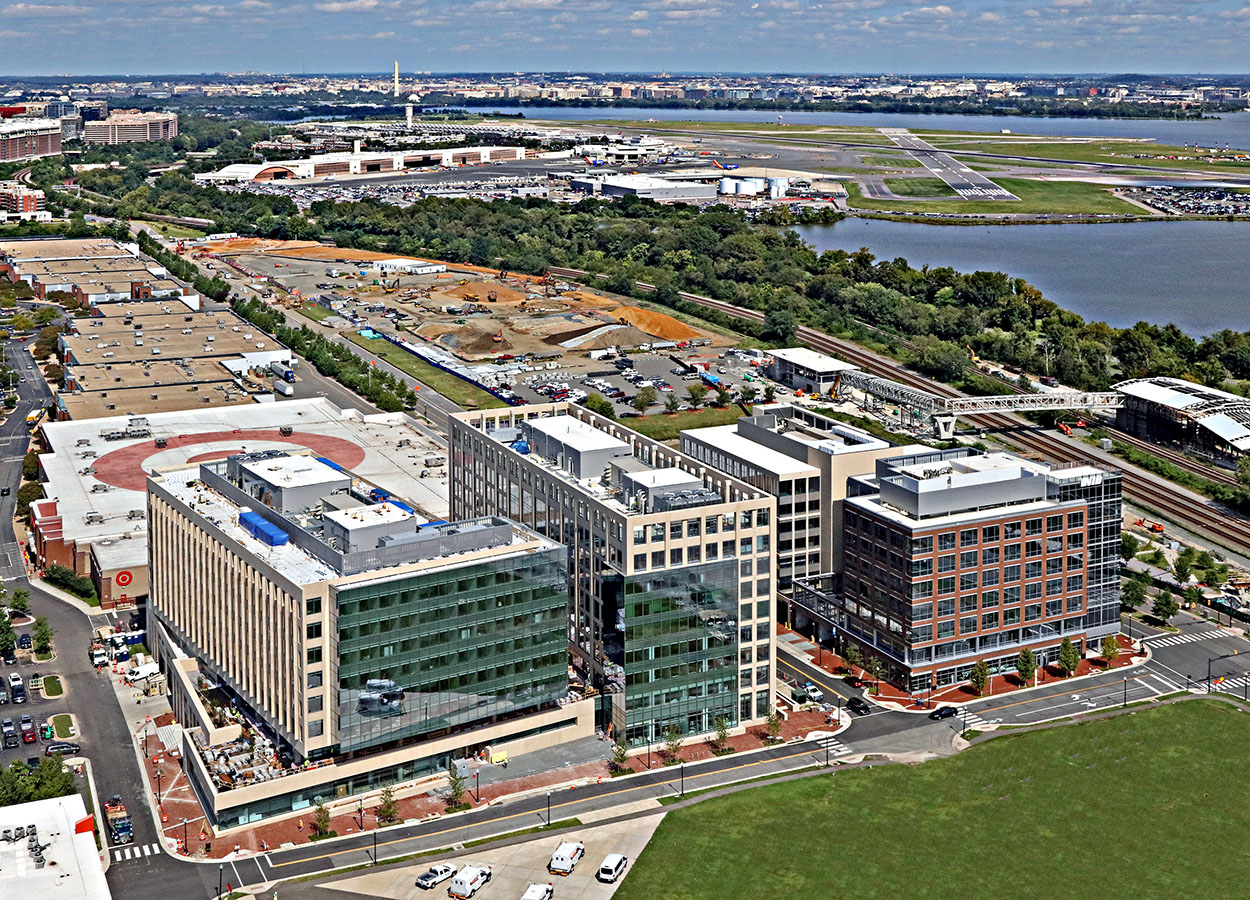
- IDA headquarters (lower left) with Reagan National Airport in the background
- Company type: Nonprofit
- Industry: Research
- Headquarters: Alexandria, Virginia, U.S.
- Key people: Norton A. Schwartz (President)
- Revenue: ▲$270 million (2021)
- Divisions: Center for Communications and Computing; Science and Technology Policy Institute; Systems and Analyses Center
- Website: www.ida.org

The Institute for Defense Analyses (IDA) is an American non-profit corporation that administers three federally funded research and development centers (FFRDCs) – the Systems and Analyses Center (SAC), the Science and Technology Policy Institute (STPI), and the Center for Communications and Computing (C&C) – to assist the United States government in addressing national security issues, particularly those requiring scientific and technical expertise. It is headquartered in Alexandria, Virginia.

== History ==
Two ideas critical to the birth of the Institute for Defense Analyses, also known as IDA, emerged from World War II. The first was the necessity for unifying the several services into a single, coordinated department. The second was the realization of the strength of the relationship between science—and scientists—and national security. The first reached fruition when President Harry Truman signed the National Security Acts of 1947 and 1949, creating the Department of Defense. (In 1947 the Department of War and the Department of the Navy had been combined to create the National Military Establishment. From it the present Defense Department was created in 1949.)

To give the nascent Office of the Secretary of Defense (OSD) the technical expertise and analytic resources to hold its own and to help make unification a reality, James Forrestal, the department's first secretary, established the Weapons Systems Evaluation Group (WSEG) in 1948 to assist OSD and the Organization of the Joint Chiefs of Staff by:

- Bringing scientific and technical as well as operational military expertise to bear in evaluating weapons systems;
- Employing advanced techniques of scientific analysis and operations research in the process; and
- Approaching its tasks from an impartial, supra-Service perspective.

The demands on WSEG were more than its small staff of military and civilian analysts could satisfy, and by the early years of the Dwight Eisenhower administration, there were calls for change. The several options gradually coalesced into one and, in 1955, the Secretary of Defense and the Chairman of the Joint Chiefs of Staff asked James R. Killian, Jr., then president of MIT, to help form a civilian, nonprofit research institute. The Institute would operate under the auspices of a university consortium to attract highly qualified scientists to assist WSEG in addressing the nation's most challenging security problems. And so, in April 1956, IDA was incorporated as a non-profit organization. In 1958, at the request of the Secretary of Defense, IDA established a division to support the newly created Advanced Research Projects Agency (ARPA), later renamed the Defense Advanced Research Projects Agency (DARPA). Shortly after its creation, the mandate of this division was broadened to include scientific and technical studies for all offices of the Director of Defense, Research and Engineering (DDR&E).

Universities overseeing IDA expanded from the five initial members in 1956 — Caltech, Case Western Reserve, MIT, Stanford and Tulane — to twelve by 1964 with the addition of California, Chicago, Columbia, Illinois, Michigan, Pennsylvania, and Princeton. University oversight of IDA ended in 1968 in the aftermath of Vietnam War-related demonstrations at Princeton, Columbia, and other member universities.

Subsequent divisions were established under what became IDA's largest research center, the Studies and Analyses Center (now the Systems and Analyses Center), to provide cost analyses, computer software and engineering, strategy and force assessments, and operational test and evaluation. IDA created the Simulation Center in the early 1990s to focus on advanced distributed simulation, and most recently, established the Joint Advanced Warfighting Program to develop new operational concepts.

IDA's support of the National Security Agency began at its request in 1959, when it established the Center for Communications Research in Princeton, New Jersey. Additional requests from NSA in 1984 and 1989 led respectively to what is now called the Center for Computing Sciences in Bowie, Maryland and to a second Center for Communications Research in La Jolla, California. These groups, which conduct research in cryptology and information operations, make up IDA's Communications and Computing FFRDC.

In 2003, IDA assumed responsibility for the Science and Technology Policy Institute, a separate FFRDC providing technical and analytic support to the Office of Science and Technology Policy and other executive branch organizations.

Throughout its history, IDA also has assisted other federal agencies. Recent work includes research performed in support of the Department of Homeland Security, the National Aeronautics and Space Administration, the Director of National Intelligence, and others.

=== Leadership ===
The following have served as president of IDA:

1. James McCormack, 1956–1959
2. Garrison Norton, 1959–1962
3. Richard M. Bissell Jr., 1962–1964
4. Jack Ruina, 1964–1966
5. Maxwell D. Taylor, 1966–1969
6. Alexander H. Flax, 1969–1983
7. Andrew Goodpaster, 1983–1985
8. William Y. Smith, 1985–1990
9. Larry D. Welch, 1990–2003
10. Dennis C. Blair, 2003–2006
11. Larry D. Welch, 2006–2009
12. David S. C. Chu, 2009–2020
13. Norton A. Schwartz, 2020–2025
14. Charles Richard, 2025–present

== Sponsors ==
IDA's Federally Funded Research and Development Centers (FFRDCs), work with governmental sponsors and do not work for commercial enterprises or for-profit organizations.

The Systems and Analyses Center's primary sponsor is the Under Secretary of Defense for Acquisition, Technology and Logistics. SAC assists the Office of the Secretary of Defense, the Joint Chiefs of Staff, the Unified Combatant Commands, and U.S. Department of Defense agencies in addressing national security issues, particularly those requiring scientific and technical expertise. With concurrence from the USD(AT&L), SAC also supports other sponsors – including the Veterans Administration Veteran's Administration; the Intelligence Community; U.S. Department of Homeland Security, U.S. Department of Commerce, and U.S. Department of Energy.

The Science and Technology Policy Institute provides analyses for the National Science Foundation as STPI's primary sponsor and the Office of Science and Technology Policy as its primary customer. STPI also provides analysis for the National Institutes of Health, the U.S. Department of Energy, the National Aeronautics and Space Agency, and other science-performing Federal agencies.

The Center for Communications and Computing supports the National Security Agency.

== IDA's FFRDCs ==
=== Systems and Analyses Center ===
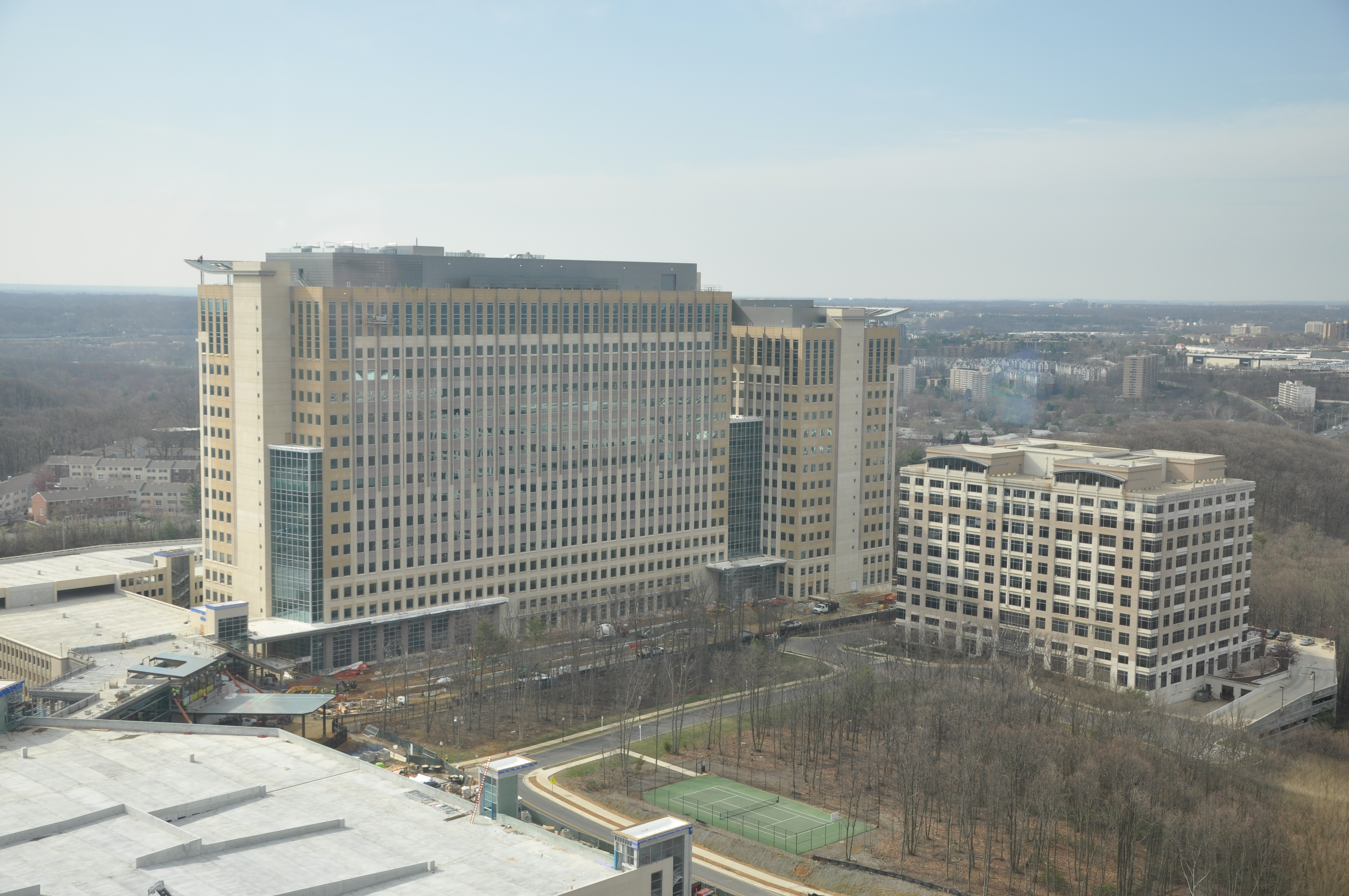
The smaller building on the right of the image is IDA's former headquarters.

The Systems and Analyses Center (SAC) is the largest of IDA's three FFRDCs and is co-located with the IDA headquarters in Alexandria, Virginia. SAC assists the Office of the Secretary of Defense (OSD), the Joint Staff, the Combatant Commands, and Defense Agencies in addressing important national security issues, focusing particularly on those requiring scientific and technical expertise. It includes the following divisions:

- Cost Analysis and Research Division (CARD) helps guide the Department of Defense and other federal agencies in the decisions, policies, and processes of resource – both people and money – allocation. Specifically, CARD analysts engage in:

- Evaluating costs for pending government acquisition or retention
- Examining resource allocation policies to guide sponsors’ decision
- Improving the efficiency and effectiveness of our sponsors’ resource allocation processes
CARD also supports the Department of Homeland Security efforts to assess and validate new anti-terrorism systems as mandated by the Support Anti-Terrorism by Fostering Effective Technologies Act. Similar to the support to DoD, analysts provide the technical evaluation ensuring that proposed technologies are safe and effective.

- Information Technology and Systems Division (ITSD) focuses on cybersecurity and other cyberspace challenges of national and global importance. ITSD researchers address all aspects of cyber from the perspectives of cyberspace operations, technology, and policy/law, and where these perspectives intersect. In particular, ITSD concentrates on these areas:

- Providing expertise on critical cyber technology procurements via in-depth knowledge of the technology and modern methods for timely acquisition of technology that matters.
- Assessing advanced concepts in rapidly changing cyber technologies while identifying and analyzing cyber risks.
- Analyzing the workforce to determine if they are ready for cyber challenges and developing training and education programs to ensure we are ready for future cyber challenges.
- Applying world-class talent in content understanding by analyzing Big Data to bring clarity to a world drowning in data
ITSD researchers have performed assessments of existing DoD cyberspace organizational constructs, developed alternative technology strategies, and advised leaders on the most effective options to enhance cyberspace operations. Analysts also assist DoD and other governmental agencies in addressing problems related to real-world operations.

- Intelligence Analyses Division (IAD) provides the United States Department of Defense, the Intelligence Community, and other cabinet departments research and analyses across a wide array of intelligence issues and disciplines. Specific examples of support to our national security include research in the following vital areas:

- Countering terrorism, including how terrorist organizations are financed; examining issues unique to Asian counterterrorism; and following developments in improvised explosive devices worldwide
- New technology, such as the use of tagging, tracking, and locating (TTL) systems, including the ability to defeat such systems, and measurement and signals intelligence (MASINT) applications, which deal with metric, angle, spatial, wavelength, time dependence, modulation, plasma, and hydromagnetic data
- Surprise technology – unanticipated technologies that might be employed against the U.S. by adversaries as the result of either scientific breakthroughs or novel applications of existing technologies.
- Cyberspace operations – tracking, analyzing, and countering digital security threats and identifying and tracking those developing, selling, and using cyber weapons on a global basis.

- Joint Advanced Warfighting Division (JAWD) focuses on the needs of the joint force commander and, in particular, the future joint force commander. Provides analytic support to post-war programmatic decisions. As DoD reviews capabilities, JAWD provides an independent analytic review of the capabilities built during the war and which ones to maintain to support the joint concept. Specifically, the division is engaged in the following:

- Linking new concepts and new technologies to a military context
- Moving from concept to reality in the military environment
- Exploring military options through structured analysis.

- Operational Evaluation Division (OED) provides technical analytical support to the DoD’s Director, Operational Test and Evaluation (DOT&E) and its mission to conduct independent assessments of the military services’ test and evaluation of new weapons systems. OED’s analytical support functions focus on:

- Conducting good tests of military systems in a realistic operational environment
- Evaluating those systems from an objective, disinterested, factually based perspective in terms of effectiveness and suitability
OED also supports the Department of Homeland Security efforts to assess and validate new anti-terrorism systems as mandated by the Support Anti-Terrorism by Fostering Effective Technologies Act. Similar to the support to DoD, analysts provide the technical evaluation that proposed technologies are safe and effective.

- Science and Technology Division (STD) provides analyses of science and technology issues related to national security. STD’s core strengths, which include:

- Electromagnetics
- Energy analysis
- Chemical, nuclear, biological detection
- Advanced optics
- Countering IEDs and mines
- Vehicle blast enhancements
- Materials and armor
- Training and human factors
- Robotic systems
STD also manages DoD’s Defense Science Studies Group to strengthen connections between the federal government and relevant science and technology communities in academia. The DSSG introduces leading, recently tenured faculty to security challenges and related technology problems.

- Strategy, Forces and Resources Division (SFRD) conducts comprehensive integrated, interdisciplinary studies of broad defense policy and long-range planning related to national strategy, organization, and management process issues. SFRD researchers and analysts conduct studies in several key areas:

- Analyzing Chemical, Biological, Radiological, and Nuclear (CBRN) defenses
- Conducting organizational effectiveness and human capital management studies
- Improving defense resource management
- Investigating international arms markets
- Researching international collaboration scenarios
- Evaluating force structure and capabilities as well as strategy and risk.

- System Evaluation Division (SED) provides independent system evaluations, analyses of alternatives, assessments of technology integration, and special system studies for DoD, typically assisting our sponsors in the following tasks:

- Formulating and investigating new operational concepts and system architectures
- Examining force- and mission-level effectiveness
- Assessing the risks, costs, and benefits of new technology insertion
- Improving the developmental test and evaluation of major military systems

=== Science and Technology Policy Institute ===
The Science and Technology Policy Institute (STPI), is located in Washington, D.C. It provides objective analysis of science and technology (S&T) policy issues for the White House Office of Science and Technology Policy (OSTP) and other offices and councils within the executive branch of the U.S. government and federal agencies. Since IDA began operating it in 2003, STPI has provided support to OSTP on topics spanning the spectrum from the ethical, legal, and societal implications of nanotechnology research to aeronautics research and development; and from understanding the effects of U.S. visa policies to efforts that facilitate international research collaboration. In carrying out its work, STPI researchers consult widely with representatives from private industry, academia, and nonprofit organizations. STPI's key functions are to:

- Analyze the effect of current and proposed S&T policies on the long-term vitality of the United States
- Provide timely and authoritative information regarding significant S&T developments and trends in the United States and abroad, with particular attention to the federal S&T portfolio
- Advise OSTP and federal agencies on the implementation and evaluation of research and development programs
- Provide technical support and analysis to the President’s Council of Advisors on Science and Technology (PCAST) and to committees and panels of the National Science and Technology Council (NSTC), under the direction of OSTP

=== Center for Communications and Computing ===
In 1959, IDA's Center for Communications and Computing was formed (as the Communications Research Division) as a private think tank dedicated to helping the National Security Agency solve advanced cryptology problems. It was headed by Cornell professor of mathematics J. Barkley Rosser (1958–61); University of Chicago mathematics chairman Abraham Adrian Albert (1961–1962); Yale University professor of mathematics Gustav A. Hedlund (1962-1963); University of Illinois/Sandia Corporation mathematician Richard A. Leibler (1963–1977); and Princeton mathematician Lee Paul Neuwirth (1977-unknown).

More recently, the centers, which now consist of a Center for Computing Sciences in Bowie, Maryland, and two Centers for Communications Research with offices in Princeton, New Jersey, and La Jolla, California, have also worked on network security issues. Within those broad areas, the research portfolio particularly focuses on the creation and analysis of sophisticated encryption methods, high-speed computing technologies, the development of advanced algorithms and their applications, algorithmic and mathematical foundations of cryptology, computer network technologies supporting communications security, information processing technologies supporting cyber security, and analytical applications for large data sets. Although the Centers in Princeton and La Jolla were founded to focus on the mathematics of cryptology, and the center in Bowie was founded to focus on computational science, all three have developed distinctive areas of expertise. Nonetheless, they work closely with each other and share many overlapping research teams.

- The Center for Communications Research, Princeton (originally called the Communications Research Division) was founded in 1959 in Princeton, New Jersey. In 1989, the Center for Communications Research, La Jolla was opened in La Jolla, California. The two centers employ more than 70 Ph.D. mathematicians and computer scientists, working on problems in cryptography, cryptanalysis, algorithms, high-performance computing, information processing, signal processing, and network security, as well as related areas of pure and applied mathematics. The day-to-day work is aimed at providing practical solutions to important real-world problems faced by NSA, and this can range from deep mathematical investigations to writing advanced computer programs to sophisticated statistical analyses of data.
- Center for Computing Sciences (CCS) was founded in 1985 in Bowie, Maryland. CCS focuses the skills of some of the country’s best computer scientists, engineers, and mathematicians on solving intelligence-related problems of importance to national security, and also on tackling problem sets of interest to the entire computational science world. CCS's original mission, the development and use of high-end computing, has expanded over the years to reflect global political and technological changes. In addition to high-performance computing for cryptography, it now includes cryptography itself, extensive projects in network security and related cyber issues, signal processing, and emerging algorithmic and mathematical techniques for analyzing extremely complex data sets. CCS works closely with the National Security Agency and US industry on the development of high-performance computing platforms.

==== Notable people associated with the Center for Communications and Computing ====
- Abraham Adrian Albert, CRD director (1961–1962)
- Leonard E. Baum
- Joe P. Buhler, CCR La Jolla director
- Don Coppersmith
- Alfred W. Hales, CCR La Jolla director
- Gustav A. Hedlund, CRD director
- Donald Knuth, 1968-1969
- Richard Leibler, CRD director
- Jill P. Mesirov
- Victor S. Miller, co-inventor of Elliptic Curve Cryptography
- Nick Patterson
- Eric M. Rains
- Coke Reed, CCR Princeton and CCS staff member
- Mary Lynn Reed
- David P. Robbins, CCR Princeton staff member (1980-2003)
- J. Barkley Rosser, CRD director (1958–1961)
- Jim Simons, CRD staff member (1964-1968)
- Lloyd R. Welch
- Malcolm J. Williamson, inventor of Diffie-Hellman key exchange

== Staff ==
IDA employs approximately 1,500 research, professional, adjunct, and support staff. Many have attended the nation's military service academies or served in the military. Approximately 56% hold doctoral degrees; 36% hold master's degrees; and 8% hold bachelor's degrees. The staff specializes in the following research disciplines:

Systems and Analyses Center

- Engineering: 23%
- Physical Sciences or Life Sciences: 26%
- Economics, Social Sciences, or Political Science: 24%
- Math, Statistics, or Operations Research: 11%
- Computer Science: 7%
- Other (includes Business Administration/Management or Humanities): 9%

Science and Technology Policy Institute

- Engineering: 29%
- Physical Sciences or Life Sciences: 28%
- Economics, Social Sciences, or Political Science: 26%
- Math, Statistics, or Operations Research: 6%
- Computer Science: 3%
- Humanities: 8%

Center for Communications and Computing

- Math, Statistics, or Operations Research: 64%
- Engineering: 10%
- Economics, Social Sciences, or Political Science: 1%
- Computer Science: 21%
- Physical Sciences or Life Sciences: 3%
- Humanities: 1%
