= Support Anti-Terrorism by Fostering Effective Technologies Act =

Support Anti-terrorism by Fostering Effective Technologies Act of 2002
- Other short titles: SAFETY Act
- Enacted by: the 107th United States Congress
- Effective: November 25, 2002

Citations
- Public law: Pub. L. 107–296 (text) (PDF)
- Statutes at Large: 116 Stat. 2135

Codification
- Titles amended: 6 U.S.C.: Domestic Security
- U.S.C. sections created: 6 U.S.C. §§ 441–444
- U.S.C. sections amended: 6 U.S.C. § 101 note

Legislative history
- Signed into law by President George W. Bush on November 25, 2002

The Support Anti-Terrorism by Fostering Effective Technologies Act of 2002, or SAFETY Act, is a US act that was enacted as Subtitle G of Title VIII of the Homeland Security Act of 2002. It creates an exclusive federal cause of action for claims against the provider of a certain "qualified anti-terrorism technology".

== Description ==
The SAFETY Act is an act that was enacted in the US as Subtitle G of Title VIII of the Homeland Security Act of 2002. It creates an exclusive federal cause of action for claims against the provider of a "qualified anti-terrorism technology" (QATT) where the QATT was deployed to protect against, in response to, or to recover from an act of terrorism. This cause of action provides limits on recovery that might otherwise be present under a state law cause of action. For instance, punitive damages cannot be recovered. The Act also specifies that QATT providers may invoke a "government contractor defense" in a lawsuit alleging product liability for such technologies following a terrorist attack. QATT providers are also required to obtain liability insurance, and the extent of liability under the cause of action is limited to the coverage limit of such required liability insurance.
