= Homeland Security Act of 2002 =

Post-9/11 United States law establishing the Department of Homeland Security

- Long title: An Act to establish the Department of Homeland Security and for other purposes.
- Acronyms (colloquial): HSA
- Enacted by: the 107th United States Congress
- Effective: November 25, 2002

Codification
- Titles amended: 6 U.S.C.: Domestic Security
- U.S.C. sections created: 6 U.S.C. ch. 1 § 101
- U.S.C. sections amended: 150 sections amended

Legislative history
- Introduced in the House as H.R. 5005 by Dick Armey (R-TX) on June 24, 2002; Committee consideration by House Homeland Security (Select), House Agriculture, House Appropriations, House Armed Services, House Energy and Commerce, House Financial Services, House Government Reform, House Intelligence (Permanent Select), House International Relations, House Judiciary, House Science, House Transportation and Infrastructure, House Ways and Means; Passed the House on July 26, 2002 (295-132, Roll call vote 367, via Clerk.House.gov); Passed the Senate on November 19, 2002 (90-9, Roll call vote 249, via Senate.gov) with amendment; House agreed to Senate amendment on November 22, 2002 (agreed); Signed into law by President George W. Bush on November 25, 2002

United States Supreme Court cases
- Department of Homeland Security v. MacLean, 574 U.S. 383 (2015)

The Homeland Security Act (HSA) of 2002 (Pub. L. 107–296 (text) (PDF), 116 Stat. 2135, enacted November 25, 2002) was an act of Congress, introduced in the aftermath of the September 11 attacks, that established the Department of Homeland Security and reorganized the US federal government. The HSA was cosponsored by 118 members of Congress. The act passed the U.S. Senate by a vote of 90–9, with one senator not voting. It was signed into law by President George W. Bush in November 2002.

The HSA also established the secretary of homeland security as a cabinet-level position. The HSA imposed the largest federal government reorganization since the Department of Defense was created via the National Security Act of 1947 (as amended in 1949). It also includes many of the organizations under which the powers of the USA PATRIOT Act are exercised.

== Background ==
The Homeland Security Advisory System scale

The new department assumed a large number of services, offices and other organizations previously conducted in other departments, such as the Customs Service, Coast Guard, and U.S. Secret Service. It superseded, but did not replace, the Office of Homeland Security, which retained an advisory role. The Homeland Security Appropriations Act of 2004 provided the new department its first funding. A major reason for the implementation of HSA is to ensure that the border function remains strong within the new Department.

The act is similar to the Intelligence Reform and Terrorism Prevention Act (IRTPA) in reorganizing and centralizing Federal security functions to meet post–Cold War threats and challenges. Like IRTPA, there are some inherent contradictions in the bill not solved by reorganization. These reflect compromises with other committees needed to secure passage, but the result is at times inconsistent or conflicting authorities. For example, the act identifies the Department of Homeland Security's (DHS) first responsibility as preventing terrorist attacks in the United States; but, the law's language makes clear that investigation and prosecution of terrorism remains with the Federal Bureau of Investigation and assigns DHS only an analytical and advisory role in intelligence activities. Similarly, with Critical Infrastructure Protection (CIP), which relates to the preparedness and response to serious incidents, the act gave DHS broad responsibility to minimize damage but only limited authority to share information and to coordinate the development of private sector best practices.

== Titles ==
The Homeland Security Act of 2002 documented under Public Law is divided into 17 titles that establishes the Department of Homeland Security and other purposes. Each title is broken down into several sections, summarized below.

1. Department of Homeland Security

Title I consists of three sections that establish the Department of Homeland Security, which carries out several missions that comply with the United States Code.

2. Information Analysis And Infrastructure Protection

Title II consists of two subtitles, including the Critical Infrastructure Information Act of 2002, and nineteen sections, including the Cyber Security Enhancement Act of 2002. It is headed by the Under Secretary and used to access, receive and analyze law enforcement information, intelligence information, and other information from federal, state, and local government agencies for further use towards the prevention of terrorist acts.

3. Science And Technology In Support of Homeland Security

Title III consists of thirteen sections. It is described as a plan to develop national policy and strategic plans to develop countermeasures for chemical, biological, radiological, nuclear and other emerging terrorist threats. It also establishes, conducts, and administers primary research and development.

4. Directorate Of Border And Transportation Security

Title IV consists of 48 sections and regulates what comes in out of United States territory in an effort to prevent terrorists and instruments of terrorism. This is done generally by securing the borders, territorial waters, ports, terminals, waterways, and air, land, and sea transportation systems of the United States, including managing and coordinating governmental activities at ports of entry.

5. Emergency Preparedness and Response

Title V consists of nine sections and it helps to ensure the response time and preparedness of providers for terrorist attacks, major disasters and other emergencies. In addition, it establishes standards, joint exercises and trainings and providing funds to the Department of Energy and the Environmental Protection Agency.

6. Treatment of Charitable Trusts For Members Of The Armed Forces Of The United States And Other Governmental Organizations

Title VI consists of one section which, through several requirements, designates the late Central Intelligence Agency officer Johnny Michael Spann as a trust fund for distribution towards surviving spouses, children, or dependent parents, grandparents, or siblings of Government related service members.

7. Management

Title VII consists of six sections which is headed by the Under Secretary to manage the budget, appropriations, expenditures of funds, accounting, and finance, human resources, information technology, and procurement of the Departments.

8. Coordination With Non-Federal Entities; Inspector General; United States Secret Service; Coast Guard; General Provisions

Title VIII consists of fifty-three sections that establishes an Office for State and Local Governments to oversee and coordinate Departmental programs for and relationships with State and local governments.

9. National Homeland Security Council

Title IX consists of six sections which establishes a "Homeland Security Council" within the Executive Office of the President. This Council functions as an advisor to the President.

10. Information Security

Title X consists of seven sections regarding the establishment of several divisions of information security. This title and its subchapter provide tactics and mechanisms for protecting federal information and preserve information security. It also establishes set standards, responsibilities, authorities and functions, the various definitions in information security, and an annual independent evaluation.

11. Department of Justice Divisions

Title XI consists of sixteen sections which detail the powers and duties of the Secretary, the Under Secretary, and the Attorney General. Subtitle B transfers the BATFE from a branch of the Department of the Treasury to a branch of the Department of Justice.

12. Airline War Risk Insurance Legislation

Title XII consists of four sections which detail air carrier liability for third-party claims arising out of acts of terrorism, extension of insurance policies, correction of reference, and reports.

13. Federal Workforce Improvement

Title XIII consists of 13 sections which in several chapters details and establishes Chief Human Capital Officers and its council.

14. Arming Pilots Against Terrorism

Title XIV consists of seven sections which contains the establishment of a program to deputize volunteer pilots of air carriers providing passenger air transportation or intrastate passenger air transportation as Federal law enforcement officers to defend the flight decks of aircraft of such air carriers against acts of criminal violence or air piracy.

15. Transition

Title XV consists of 10 sections establishing the 12-month period beginning on the effective date of this Act. It consists of the definitions, reorganization plan, plan elements, and modification of plans.

16. Corrections To Existing Law Relating To Airline Transportation Security

Title XVI consists of three sections that establish retention of security sensitive information authority at the Department of Transportation, increase civil penalties, and allow United States citizens and United States nationals as screeners.

17. Conforming And Technical Amendments

Title XVII consists of seven sections that amend or alter several acts and amendments of the United States such as the Inspector General Act of 1978 and Title 5 of the United States Code

== Department of Homeland Security ==
Seal of the United States Department of Homeland Security

The United States Department of Homeland Security (DHS), formed on November 25, 2002, through the Homeland Security Act, is a Cabinet department composed of several different divisions that work to protect the United States from domestic and foreign terrorism. It was created as a response to the September 11 attacks in 2001. The Department of Homeland Security manages the Emergency Preparedness and Response Directorate. The directorate helps fulfill the department's overarching goal: to keep America safe from terrorist attacks. The department also works to enhance preparedness and response efforts and to integrate these efforts with prevention work. With the Homeland Security Act there are several provisions that identify the specific duties for the EP&R Directorate.

=== Provisions ===
The Homeland Security Act contains several provisions that identify specific duties for the EP&R Directorate. Title V and Title II outline the way the department ensures that the use of intelligence and its own threat analysis of terrorist capabilities are intended to distribute funds to those areas where the terrorist threat is greatest, and that states provide the Federal Government with their Emergency Response Plans so that the department can coordinate priorities regionally and nationally.

=== Establishments under the Homeland Security Department ===
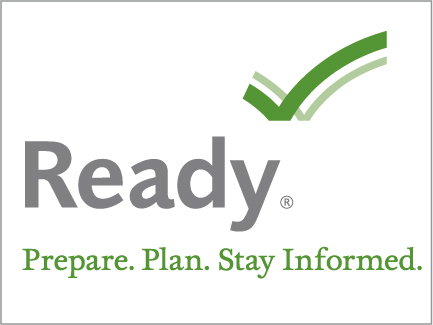
Full Ready.gov logo with tagline and trademark notice

- Ready.gov which was conceived in March 2002 and launched in February 2003
- National Incident Management System which was established in March 2004
- National Response Plan (NRP) which was created in December 2004
- National Cyber Security Division (NCSD)
- E-Verify

== Amendments ==
=== Proposed ===
- Department of Homeland Security Interoperable Communications Act (H.R. 4289; 113th Congress) - a bill that would amend the Homeland Security Act of 2002 to make the Under Secretary for Management of the Department of Homeland Security (DHS) responsible for policies and directives to achieve and maintain interoperable communications among DHS components. The bill was written in reaction to a 2012 report by the DHS Inspector General that indicated DHS "lacks an effective governance structure to ensure interoperable communications across divisions.
- National Cybersecurity and Critical Infrastructure Protection Act of 2013 (H.R. 3696; 113th Congress) – a bill that would amend the Homeland Security Act of 2002 to require the Secretary of the Department of Homeland Security (DHS) to conduct cybersecurity activities on behalf of the federal government and would codify the role of DHS in preventing and responding to cybersecurity incidents involving the Information Technology (IT) systems of federal civilian agencies and critical infrastructure in the United States. The bill passed in the United States House of Representatives on July 28, 2014.

== Legislative information ==
- Senate: S. 2794
- House: H.R. 5005 HR. Rept. 107-609
- Law: Pub. L. 107–296 (text) (PDF), 117 Stat. 745

== See also ==
- Federal Emergency Management Agency, established by the Homeland Security Department
- History of homeland security in the United States
- Homeland Security Advisory System
- Homeland Security Appropriations Act
- Homeland Security Grant Program
- Intelligence Reform and Terrorism Prevention Act
- September 11 attacks
- Terrorism in the United States
- United States Department of Homeland Security
- Support Anti-Terrorism by Fostering Effective Technologies Act (Title VII, Subtitle G of the HSA)
