= Science and Technology Policy Institute =

US federally-funded research and development center

- Abbreviation: STPI
- Formation: 5 November 1990
- Type: Federally Funded Research and Development Center
- Purpose: Policy Analysis
- Location: Washington, D.C., U.S.
- Fields: Science Policy; Technology Policy
- Parent organization: Institute for Defense Analyses
- Affiliations: Office of Science and Technology Policy; National Science Foundation
- Website: www.ida.org/en/ida-ffrdcs/science-and-technology-policy-institute
- Formerly called: Critical Technologies Institute

The Science and Technology Policy Institute (STPI, IPA: stɪpi "stip-ee") is a federally funded research and development center located in Washington, D.C. STPI provides objective research and analysis on science and technology policy issues in support of the White House Office of Science and Technology Policy (OSTP), as well as for its sponsor, the National Science Foundation, and other science-performing federal agencies. STPI is administered by the non-profit Institute for Defense Analyses, located in Alexandria, Virginia. As of May 2020, Kristen Kulinowski is the current director of STPI.

== History ==
In 1990, Congress chartered the Critical Technologies Institute (CTI) through the National Defense Authorization Act for Fiscal Year 1991. This law established CTI as a federally funded research and development center under the sponsorship of the Office of Science and Technology Policy and supported by appropriations from the Department of Defense. During this period, CTI was administered by RAND Corporation. In 1998, Congress enacted the National Science Foundation Authorization Act of 1998, changing the name of the Critical Technologies Institute to the Science and Technology Policy Institute (STPI). This act also changed the sponsorship of STPI from the Department of Defense to the National Science Foundation and amended the institute's duties. In 2003, RAND Corporation was replaced by the Institute for Defense Analyses as the administrator of STPI. As of 2020, there are approximately 40 individuals employed full-time, and STPI is able to contract for additional expertise on specific projects. Further, STPI is able to call upon approximately 800 of the IDA's other employees for project aid when necessary.

== Sponsors and responsibilities ==
The Science and Technology Policy Institute's primary sponsor is the National Science Foundation (NSF), which is the main source of appropriations for STPI. NSF STPI funding for fiscal year 2020 is reported to be $4.74 million. STPI's primary customer is the White House Office of Science and Technology Policy (OSTP). The work at STPI primarily focuses on supporting OSTP and its director, as well as her role as a co-chair of the United States President's Council of Advisors on Science and Technology. STPI also provides analytical support to the National Science Foundation (NSF), the National Aeronautics and Space Agency (NASA), the National Institutes of Health (NIH), the National Oceanic and Atmospheric Administration (NOAA), the Department of Energy, the Department of Health and Human Services, the Department of Transportation, and other science-performing federal agencies within the executive branch of the United States government.

STPI provides technical analysis in a broad range of science and technology topics, including innovation, environment and energy, STEM education and workforce, space and aviation, life sciences, and scientometrics. The institute is responsible for compiling, analyzing, and interpreting information on significant science and technology research developments and trends, both in the United States and abroad. In particular, emphasis is placed on how the scope and content of federal science and technology research and development affects national and interagency issues. Other STPI duties include initiating studies and analyses to determine appropriate roles for federal and state governments, higher education institutions, and private industry in the development and application of science and technology; the primary aim is to support the long-term strength of the United States in science and technology research and development. STPI also provides technical support and assistance to the President's Council of Advisors on Science and Technology and interagency committees and panels of the federal government concerned with science and technology. STPI is required to submit an annual report to the President regarding progress made towards carrying out the responsibilities of the institute.

== Research capabilities ==
According to the IDA, STPI is able to conduct sponsored research projects in the fields of economics, energy, environment, scientometrics, information technologies, innovation and competitiveness, life sciences, international science and technology, national and homeland security, and social and behavioral sciences and education.

== Space technology and policy ==
STPI has a dedicated portfolio of independent and sponsored projects in the following areas related to space policy: space commercialization and legal/policy/regulatory challenges; strategic planning/coordination; space threats; exploration and space science and technology; and international activities. Select reports generated from these projects are available to the public on the STPI space portfolio website.

== Fellowships and internships ==
The STPI offers two-year science and technology policy fellowships to individuals who have recently received bachelor's degrees. Fellows work on research projects with STPI researchers as well as various other federal government organizations including the National Science Foundation, Office of Science and Technology Policy (OSTP) and National Institutes of Health.

Paid, 10–12 week summer associate internships at IDA's Virginia and Washington, D.C. locations are also offered to current rising senior undergraduate and graduate students. Summer associates work on projects for IDA sponsors such as data analysis, literature reviews, writing reports, and designing projects.
