= Federally funded research and development centers =

Federally funded research and development centers (FFRDCs) are public–private partnerships that conduct research and development for the United States government. Under Federal Acquisition Regulation § 35.017, FFRDCs are operated by universities and corporations to fulfill certain long-term needs of the government that "...cannot be met as effectively by existing in-house or contractor resources." While similar in many ways to University Affiliated Research Centers, FFRDCs are prohibited from competing for work. There are currently 41 FFRDCs, each sponsored by one or more U.S. government departments or agencies.

Out of the 41 active Federally Funded Research and Development centers (FFRDCs),26 are research and development laboratories,10 are study and analysis centers, and 5 are system engineering and integration centers. Federally Funded Research and Development Centers are contractor- operated(R&D). Similar activities that are in support of the federal agency's mission. FFRDCs are federally dependent research institutions however, they are operated and managed by contractors. They are required to have a long-term strategic relationships with the federal agency that are in support of them. This relationship is to insure the number of benefits, recruit and retain scientific and technical expertise, and the capability to rapidly respond to the needs of the federal agency.

(R&D) have made an impact on the economic growth, and productivity, they have also made new processes and products that have impacted the quality of lives. Federal funding of basic research is favorable for the potential for spillovers and the benefits that comes from that. The studies of federal spending for basic research that was conducted at academic institutions estimated that the average returns from spending are much higher than the ones that the resources were put to other uses. Federal spending shows the benefits that you could easily compare however if you compare it to individual projects results will vary.

== History ==
Since the 1960s, private businesses in the U.S. have provided an increasing share of funding for research and development, as direct federal funding waned.

During World War II, scientists, engineers, mathematicians, and other specialists became part of the massive United States war effort—leading to evolutions in radar, aircraft, computing, and the development of nuclear weapons through the Manhattan Project. The end of armed conflict did not end the need for organized research and development in support of the government.

As the Cold War became the new reality, government officials and their scientific advisors advanced the idea of a systematic approach to research, development, and acquisitions—one independent of the ups and downs of the marketplace and free of the restrictions on civil service. From this idea arose the concept of FFRDCs—private entities that would work almost exclusively on behalf of the government—free of organizational conflicts of interest and with a stable workforce of highly trained technical talent.

The U.S. Air Force created the first FFRDC, the RAND Corporation, in 1947. In 1948, the RAND Corporation became an independent nonprofit. Others grew directly out of their wartime roles. For example, MIT Lincoln Laboratory, founded in 1951, originated as the Radiation Laboratory at MIT, and the Navy's Operations Research Group evolved into the Center for Naval Analyses. The first FFRDCs served the Department of Defense. Since then, other government organizations have sponsored FFRDCs to meet their specific needs. In 1969, the number of FFRDCs peaked at 74.

Army Chief Dwight. D Eisenhower created a Research and Development division in 1946. The division helped to speed up technological advances in the army. In 1948 the army created a group with Johns Hopkins University which soon became an Operations Research organization. They used a University in order to attract researchers. The university gave them room to work independently.

Until 1967, FFRDCs were called Federal Contract Research Centers; the name was changed by the Federal Council for Science and Technology, which also introduced specific criteria for future FFRDCs.

By 1976, the number of FFRDCs had dropped to around 39. Some defense centers closed , and others had moved into private sectors. During the 1980s, a federal procurement policy set procedures for reviewing, creating, and closing FFRDCs. Federal Acquisition Regulations were updated in 1990 to reflect the policy.

== List ==
The following list includes all current FFRDCs:

Facility	Administrator	Location	
Aerospace FFRDC	The Aerospace Corporation	El Segundo, California	Department of Defense, Department of the Air Force
Ames National Laboratory	Iowa State University of Science and Technology	Ames, Iowa	Department of Energy
Argonne National Laboratory	UChicago Argonne, LLC	Argonne, Illinois	Department of Energy
Arroyo Center	RAND Corporation	Santa Monica, California	Department of Defense, Department of the Army
Brookhaven National Laboratory	Brookhaven Science Associates, LLC	Upton, New York	Department of Energy
Center for Advanced Aviation System Development	MITRE	McLean, Virginia	Department of Transportation, Federal Aviation Administration
Center for Communications and Computing	Institute for Defense Analyses	Bowie, Maryland; La Jolla, California; Princeton, New Jersey; Alexandria,VA	Department of Defense, National Security Agency
Center for Enterprise Modernization	MITRE	McLean, Virginia	Department of the Treasury, Internal Revenue Service; Department of Veterans Affairs; Social Security Administration
Center for Naval Analyses	The CNA Corporation	Arlington County, Virginia	Department of Defense, Department of the Navy
Center for Nuclear Waste Regulatory Analyses	Southwest Research Institute	San Antonio, Texas	Nuclear Regulatory Commission
CMS Alliance to Modernize Healthcare	MITRE	McLean, Virginia	Department of Health and Human Services, Centers for Medicare & Medicaid Services
Fermi National Accelerator Laboratory	Fermi Forward Discovery Group, LLC	Batavia, Illinois	Department of Energy
Frederick National Laboratory for Cancer Research	Leidos Biomedical Research	Frederick, Maryland	Department of Health and Human Services, National Institutes of Health
Homeland Security Operational Analysis Center	RAND Corporation	Crystal City, Virginia	Department of Homeland Security, Under Secretary for Science and Technology
Homeland Security Systems Engineering and Development Institute	MITRE	McLean, Virginia	Department of Homeland Security, Under Secretary for Science and Technology
Idaho National Laboratory	Battelle Energy Alliance, LLC	Idaho Falls, Idaho	Department of Energy
Jet Propulsion Laboratory	California Institute of Technology	Pasadena, California	National Aeronautics and Space Administration
Lawrence Berkeley National Laboratory	University of California	Berkeley, California	Department of Energy
Lawrence Livermore National Laboratory	Lawrence Livermore National Security, LLC	Livermore, California	Department of Energy
Lincoln Laboratory	Massachusetts Institute of Technology	Lexington, Massachusetts	Department of Defense, Under Secretary of Defense for Research and Engineering
Los Alamos National Laboratory	Triad National Security, LLC	Los Alamos, New Mexico	Department of Energy
National Biodefense Analysis and Countermeasures Center	Battelle National Biodefense Institute	Frederick, Maryland	Department of Homeland Security, Under Secretary for Science and Technology
National Center for Atmospheric Research	University Corporation for Atmospheric Research	Boulder, Colorado	National Science Foundation
National Cybersecurity FFRDC	MITRE	Rockville, Maryland	Department of Commerce, National Institute of Standards and Technology
National Defense Research Institute	RAND Corporation	Santa Monica, California	Department of Defense, Under Secretary of Defense for Acquisition and Sustainment
National Optical-Infrared Astronomy Research Laboratory	Association of Universities for Research in Astronomy, Inc.	Tucson, Arizona	National Science Foundation
National Radio Astronomy Observatory	Associated Universities, Inc.	Socorro, New Mexico; Charlottesville, Virginia	National Science Foundation
National Laboratory of the Rockies	Alliance for Sustainable Energy, LLC	Golden, Colorado	Department of Energy
National Security Engineering Center	MITRE	Bedford, Massachusetts; McLean, Virginia	Department of Defense, Under Secretary of Defense for Research and Engineering
National Solar Observatory	Association of Universities for Research in Astronomy, Inc.	Boulder, Colorado	National Science Foundation
Oak Ridge National Laboratory	UT-Battelle, LLC	Oak Ridge, Tennessee	Department of Energy
Pacific Northwest National Laboratory	Battelle Memorial Institute	Richland, Washington	Department of Energy
Princeton Plasma Physics Laboratory	Princeton University	Princeton, New Jersey	Department of Energy
Project Air Force	RAND Corporation	Santa Monica, California	Department of Defense, Department of the Air Force
Sandia National Laboratories	National Technology and Engineering Solutions of Sandia, LLC	Albuquerque, New Mexico; Livermore, CA	Department of Energy
Savannah River National Laboratory	Battelle Savannah River Alliance, LLC	Aiken, South Carolina	Department of Energy
Science and Technology Policy Institute	Institute for Defense Analyses	Washington, D.C.	National Science Foundation
SLAC National Accelerator Laboratory	Stanford University	Stanford, California	Department of Energy
Software Engineering Institute	Carnegie Mellon University	Pittsburgh, Pennsylvania	Department of Defense, Under Secretary of Defense for Research and Engineering
Systems and Analyses Center	Institute for Defense Analyses	Alexandria, Virginia	Department of Defense, Under Secretary of Defense for Acquisition and Sustainment
Thomas Jefferson National Accelerator Facility	Jefferson Science Associates, LLC	Newport News, Virginia	Department of Energy

== See also ==
- List of R&D laboratories
