= The Integration Centre =

Irish NGO

The Integration Centre is a non-governmental organisation (NGO) based in Ireland, committed to the integration and inclusion of people from immigrant backgrounds into Irish society. The centre was opened in July 2009, based on the merger of two NGOs: the Refugee Information Service and Integrating Ireland, The Immigrant Network.

== Main programme areas ==
The NGO focuses mainly on conceptualizing and implementing integration plans at local and national levels, as well as monitoring the integration rate based on a new tool developed specifically for that purpose, and lastly, providing reliable information and services to immigrants seeking assistance.

== Integration monitoring ==
The Integration Centre monitors immigrant integration at the national and local levels and thereby assesses what is working, what is not, and how the situation is changing over time. This provides a mechanism for comparing outcomes across local authority areas and Ireland’s performance at EU level. Together with help from The Economic and Social Research Institute (ESRI), The Centre has developed the first national monitoring framework and tool for Ireland. It uses integration indicators with the goal of assisting government at local and national levels to meet its monitoring obligations. This Integration Monitor seeks to measure migrant integration in four life domains annually: employment, education, social inclusion and active citizenship.

== Integration planning ==
The Integration Centre collaborates with local authorities around the country in the implementation of integration plans. The Centre works towards creating interest among key stakeholder groups at Local Authority level; supporting the formation of integration fora; enhancing ethnic minority participation; the provision of training; and the monitoring of progress over time.

== Information and personal casework ==
The Integration Centre provides immigrants with information on a number of different issues such as citizenship, family reunification, and the asylum system; by offering information clinics in Galway and Dublin. And also offers phone and email services.

== Funders ==
The Integration Centre received the majority of its funding from three organizations:

• The Atlantic Philanthropies, dedicated to bringing about lasting changes in the lives of people who are disadvantaged by their economic situation, race, nationality, gender, age, disabilities, immigration status, sexual orientation, political affiliation or religion.

• The One Foundation, a private philanthropic fund based in Dublin, Ireland. Its aim is to significantly improve the life chances of disadvantaged children and young people in Ireland and Vietnam. By supporting non-profit organisations, they address three key social issues that affect young people today: Poverty & Disadvantage, Mental Health and the Integration of Minorities.

• The Citizens Information Board, the statutory body which supports the provision of information, advice and advocacy on a broad range of public and social services. It provides the Citizens Information website, and supports the voluntary network of Citizens Information Centres and the Citizens Information. It also funds and supports the Money Advice and Budgeting Service (MABS).

== Merger with Immigrant Council of Ireland ==
In late 2014 The Integration Centre announced it would be merging with the Immigrant Council of Ireland, focusing on the monitoring of national and local government integration strategies.
