= National Synchrotron Light Source =

NSLS
- Interactive map of the NSLS area

General information
- Type: Research and Development Facility
- Location: Upton, United States
- Coordinates: 40°52′05″N 72°52′35″W
- Construction started: 1978
- Completed: 1982 UV ring 1984 X-ray ring
- Renovated: 1986
- Cost: $160,000,000 USD
- Owner: Department of Energy

Website
- Original NSLS web page

The National Synchrotron Light Source (NSLS) at Brookhaven National Laboratory (BNL) in Upton, New York was a national user research facility funded by the U.S. Department of Energy (DOE). Built from 1978 through 1984, and officially shut down on September 30, 2014, the NSLS was considered a second-generation synchrotron.

The NSLS experimental floor consisted of two electron storage rings: an X-ray ring and a VUV (vacuum ultraviolet) ring which provided intense, focused light spanning the electromagnetic spectrum from the infrared through X-rays. The properties of this light and the specially designed experimental stations, called beamlines, allowed scientists in many fields of research to perform experiments not otherwise possible at their own laboratories.

== History ==
Ground was broken for the NSLS on September 28, 1978. The VUV ring began operations in late 1982 and the X-ray ring was commissioned in 1984. In 1986, a second phase of construction expanded the NSLS by 52,000 square feet (4,800 m^{2}), which added offices, laboratories and room for new experimental equipment. After 32 years of producing synchrotron light, the final stored beam was dumped at 16.00 EDT on 30 September 2014, and NSLS was officially shut down.

During the construction of the NSLS, two scientists, Renate Chasman and George Kenneth Green, invented a special periodic arrangement of magnetic elements (a magnetic lattice) to provide optimized bending and focusing of electrons. The design was called the Chasman–Green lattice, and it became the basis of design for every synchrotron storage ring. Storage rings are characterized by the number of straight sections and bend sections in their design. The bend sections produce more light than the straight sections due to the change in angular momentum of the electrons. Chasman and Green accounted for this in their design by adding insertion devices, known as wigglers and undulators, in the straight sections of the storage ring. These insertion devices produce the brightest light among the sections of the ring and thus, beamlines are typically built downstream from them.

=== VUV ring ===
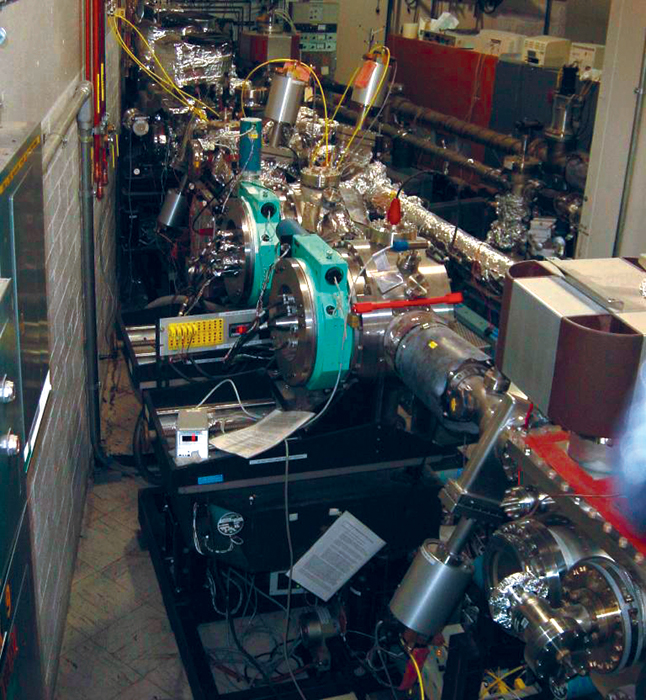
A beamline for synchrotron light at Brookhaven.

The VUV ring at the National Synchrotron Light Source was one of the first of the 2nd generation light sources to operate in the world. It was initially designed in 1976 and commissioned in 1983. During the Phase II upgrade in 1986, two insertion wigglers/undulators were added to the VUV ring, providing the highest brightness source in the vacuum ultraviolet region until the advent of 3rd generation light sources.

=== X-ray ring ===
The X-ray ring at the National Synchrotron Light Source was one of the first storage rings designed as a dedicated source of synchrotron radiation. The final lattice design was completed in 1978 and the first stored beam was obtained in September 1982. By 1985, the experimental program was in a rapid state of development, and by the end of 1990, the Phase II beamlines and insertion devices were brought into operation.

== Design ==
Electrons generate the synchrotron radiation that was used at the end stations of beamlines. The electrons are first produced by a 100 KeV triode electron gun. These electrons then proceeded through a linear accelerator (linac), which got them up to 120 MeV. Next, the electrons entered a booster ring, where their energy was increased to 750 MeV, and were then injected into either the VUV ring or the X-ray ring. In the VUV ring, the electrons were further ramped up to 825 MeV and electrons in the X-ray ring were ramped to 2.8 GeV.

Once in the ring, VUV or X-ray, the electrons orbit and lose energy as a result of changes in their angular momentum, which cause the expulsion of photons. These photons are deemed white light, i.e. polychromatic, and are the source of synchrotron radiation. Before being used in a beamline endstation, the light is collimated before reaching a monochromator or series of monochromators to get a single and fixed wavelength.

During normal operations, the electrons in the storage rings lost energy and as such, the rings were re-injected every 12 (X-ray ring) and 4 (VUV ring) hours. The difference in time arose from the fact that VUV light has a larger wavelength and thus has lower energy which leads to faster decay, while the X-rays have a very small wavelength and are high energy.

This was the first synchrotron to be controlled using microprocessors.

== Facilities ==
The UV ring had 19 beamlines, while the X-ray ring had 58 beamlines. The beamlines were operated and funded in numerous ways. However, since the NSLS was a user facility, any scientist that submitted a proposal could be granted beamtime after peer-review. There were two types of beamlines at the NSLS: Facility Beamlines (FBs), which were operated by the NSLS staff and reserved a minimum of 50 percent of their beamtime for users, and Participating Research Team (PRT) beamlines, which were operated and staffed by external groups and reserved at least 25 percent of their beamtime for users.

Each X-ray beamline had an endstation called a hutch. These are large enclosures made of radiation shielding materials, such as steel and leaded glass, to protect the users from the ionizing radiation of the beam. On the X-ray floor, many of the experiments conducted used techniques such as X-ray diffraction, high-resolution powder diffraction (PXRD), XAFS, DAFS (X-ray diffraction anomalous fine structure), WAXS, and SAXS.

On the VUV ring, the endstations were usually UHV (ultra-high vacuum) chambers that were used to conduct experiments using methods such as XPS, UPS, LEEM, and NEXAFS.

In some beamlines, there were other analytical tools used in conjunction with synchrotron radiation, such as a mass spectrometer, a high-power laser, or a gas chromatography mass spectrometer. These techniques helped supplement and better quantify the experiments carried out at the endstation.

=== Achievements and statistics ===
==== Nobel prizes ====
In 2003, Roderick MacKinnon won the Nobel Prize in Chemistry for deciphering the structure of the neuronal ion channel. His work was in part conducted at the NSLS. In 2009, Venkatraman Ramakrishnan and Thomas A. Steitz, and Ada E. Yonath won the Nobel Prize in Chemistry for imaging the ribosome with atomic resolution through their use of x-ray crystallography at the NSLS and other synchrotron light sources.

==== User statistics ====
The National Synchrotron Light Source hosted more than 2,200 users from 41 U.S. states and 30 other countries in 2009. In 2009, there were 658 journal publications and 764 total publications including journal publications, books, patents, thesis, and reports.

== NSLS-II ==
The NSLS was permanently shutdown on September 30, 2014, after more than 30 years of service. It was replaced by the NSLS-II, which was designed to be 10,000 times brighter.

== See also ==
- Center for Functional Nanomaterials
- List of synchrotron radiation facilities
- Synchrotron radiation
- Synchrotron
- United States Department of Energy national laboratories
