= National Synchrotron Light Source II =

National laboratory in New York, United States

NSLS-II
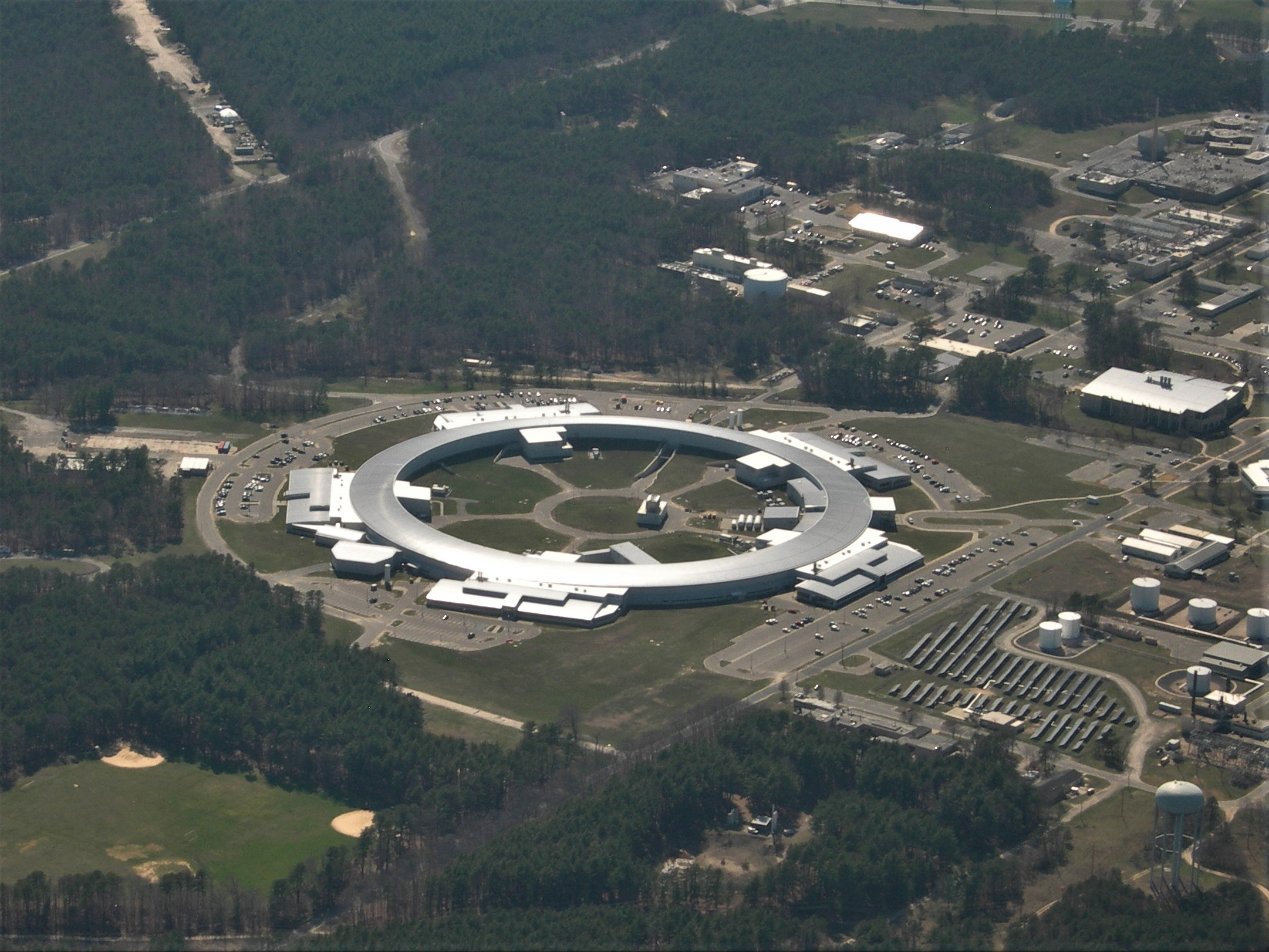
- An aerial view of the National Synchrotron Light Source II (NSLS-II) at Brookhaven National Laboratory
- Interactive map of the NSLS-II area

General information
- Type: Research and Development Facility
- Location: Upton, New York, United States
- Coordinates: 40°51′55.38″N 72°52′19.71″W
- Construction started: 2009
- Completed: 2015
- Cost: US$912 million
- Owner: United States Department of Energy

Technical details
- Floor area: 400,000 sq ft (37,000 m^{2})

Design and construction
- Architecture firm: HDR, Inc.
- Main contractor: Torcon, Inc.

Website
- BNL: National Synchrotron Light Source II (NSLS-II)

The National Synchrotron Light Source II (NSLS-II) at Brookhaven National Laboratory (BNL) in Upton, New York is a national user research facility funded primarily by the U.S. Department of Energy's (DOE) Office of Science. NSLS-II is a synchrotron light source, designed to produce X-rays 10,000 times brighter than BNL's original light source, the National Synchrotron Light Source (NSLS). NSLS-II supports research in energy security, advanced materials synthesis and manufacturing, environment, and human health.

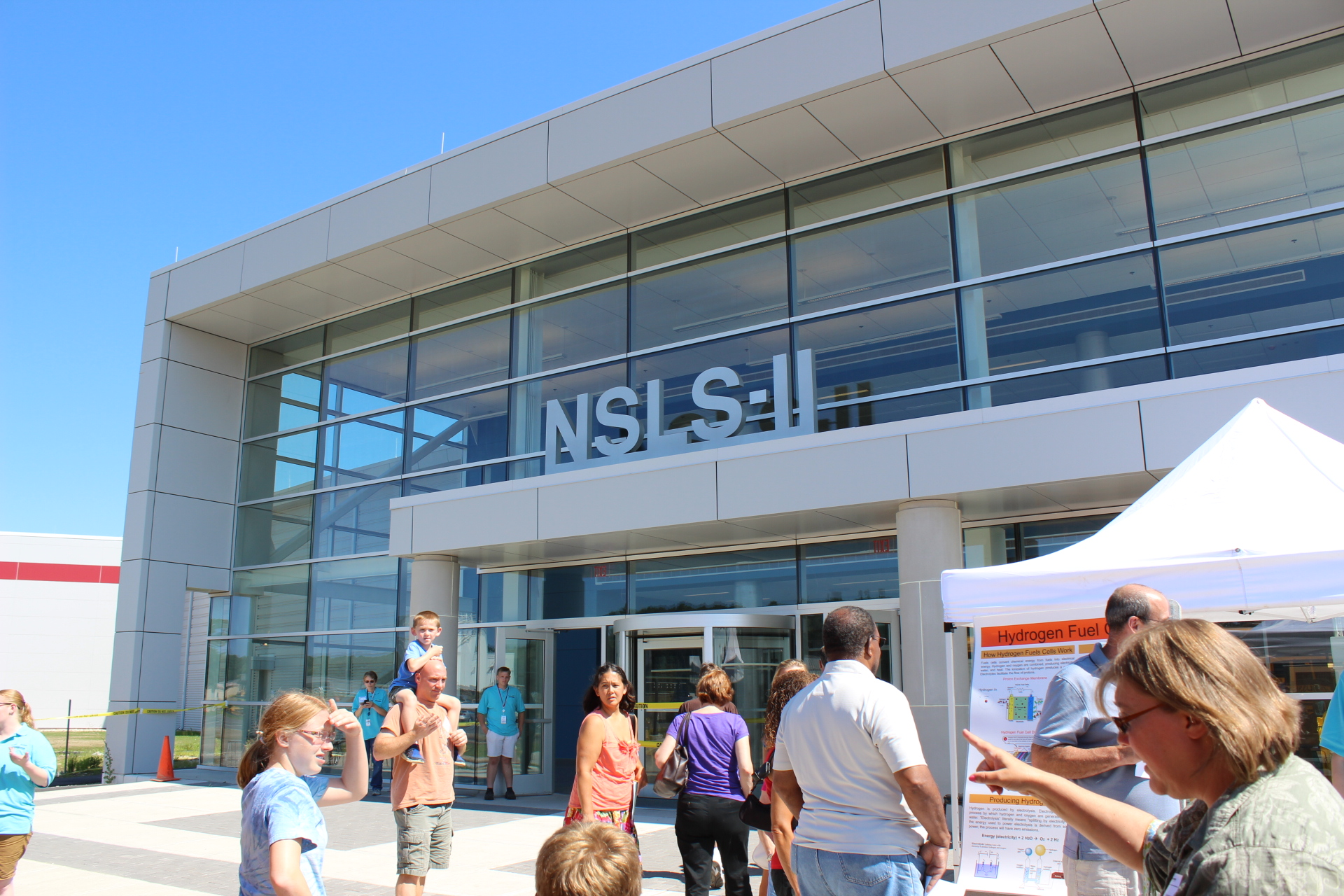
Exterior of National Synchrotron Light Source II facility, taken 22 July 2012 during Brookhaven National Laboratory "Summer Sundays" public tour.

== Users and partners ==
=== Users ===
In order to use the NSLS-II, researchers submit a peer-reviewed proposal. In 2023, NSLS-II served over 1,885 unique researchers from academic, industrial, and government laboratories worldwide.

=== Partners ===
NSLS-II has partners with public and private institutions which joined effort to fund the construction and operation of some of its beamlines. Its partnerships include BNL's Center for Functional Nanomaterials and the National Institute of Standards and Technology.

== Beamlines ==
NSLS-II currently has 29 beamlines (experimental stations) open for operations. When the facility is complete, NSLS-II is expected to "be capable of supporting some 58 beamlines in total."

The beamlines at NSLS-II are grouped into seven science programs: hard X-ray methods, spectroscopy, imaging and microscopy, bioimaging, structural biology, electronic structure techniques, and complex scattering. These programs group beamlines together that offer similar types of research techniques for studying the behavior and structure of matter.

=== Hard X-ray methods ===
- 6-ID: High Resolution Powder Diffraction (HRD) (under development)
- 27-ID: High Energy X-ray Diffraction (HEX)
- 28-ID-1: Pair Distribution Function (PDF)
- 28-ID-2: X-Ray Powder Diffraction (XPD)

=== Spectroscopy ===
- 6-BM: Beamline for Materials Measurement (BMM)
- 7-BM: Quick X-ray Absorption and Scattering (QAS)
- 7-ID-1: Spectroscopy Soft and Tender 1 (SST-1)
- 7-ID-2: Spectroscopy Soft and Tender 2 (SST-2)
- 8-BM: Tender Energy X-ray Absorption Spectroscopy (TES)
- 8-ID: Inner-Shell Spectroscopy (ISS)
- 23-ID-2: In situ and Operando Soft X-Ray Spectroscopy (IOS)

=== Imaging and microscopy ===
- 3-ID: Hard X-ray Nanoprobe (HXN)
- 5-ID: Submicron Resolution X-ray Spectroscopy (SRX)
- 9-ID: Coherent Diffractive Imaging (CDI)
- 18-ID: Full-Field X-ray Imaging (FXI)
- 26-ID-1: Advanced Nanoscale Imaging (ANI) (under development)
- 26-ID-2: Tender X-ray Nanoprobe (TXN) (under development)
- 29-ID-1: Soft X-ray Nanoprobe (SXN) (under construction)

=== Structural biology ===
- 16-ID: Life Science X-ray Scattering (LIX)
- 17-ID-1: Highly Automated Macromolecular Crystallography Beamline (AMX)
- 17-ID-2: Frontier Microfocusing Macromolecular Crystallography (FMX)
- 17-BM: X-ray Footprinting of Biological Materials (XFP)
- 19-ID: Biological Microdiffraction Facility (NYX)

=== Bioimaging ===
- 4-BM: X-ray Fluorescence Microprobe (XFM)
- 16-BM: Quantitative Cellular Tomography (QCT) (under development)

=== Electronic Structure Techniques ===
- 2-ID: Soft Inelastic X-ray Scattering (SIX)
- 21-ID: Electron Spectro-Microscopy (ESM)
- 22-IR-1: Frontier Synchrotron Infrared Spectroscopy (FIS)
- 22-IR-2: Magnetospectroscopy, Ellipsomentry and Time-Resolved Optical Spectroscopies (MET)
- 23-ID-1: Coherent Soft X-ray Scattering (CSX)
- 24-IR: IR Nanospectroscopy Microspectroscopy (INF) (under development)
- 29-ID-2: NanoARPES and NanoRIXS (ARI) (under construction)

=== Complex scattering ===
- 4-ID: Integrated In-situ and Resonant Hard X-ray Studies (ISR)
- 10-ID: Inelastic X-ray Scattering (IXS)
- 11-ID: Coherent Hard X-ray Scattering (CHX)
- 11-BM: Complex Materials Scattering (CMS)
- 12-ID: Soft Matter Interfaces (SMI)
- 13-ID: Advanced Materials Processes (AMP) (under development)

== Storage ring parameters ==
NSLS-II is a medium energy (3.0 GeV) electron storage ring designed to deliver photons with high average spectral brightness exceeding 10^{21} ph/s in the 2–10 keV energy range and a flux density exceeding 10^{15} ph/s in all spectral ranges. This performance requires the storage ring to support a very high-current electron beam (up to 500 mA) with a very small horizontal (down to 0.5 nm-rad) and vertical (8 pm-rad) emittance. The electron beam is stable in its position (<10% of its size), angle (<10% of its divergence), dimensions (<10%), and intensity (±0.5% variation).

=== Storage ring lattice ===
The NSLS-II storage ring lattice consists of 30 double-bend achromat (DBA) cells that can accommodate at least 58 beamlines for experiments, distributed by type of source as follows:

- 15 low-beta ID straights for undulators or superconducting wigglers
- 12 high-beta ID straights for either undulators or damping wigglers
- 31 BM ports providing broadband sources covering the IR, VUV, and soft X-ray ranges. Any of these ports can alternatively be replaced by a 3PW port covering the hard X-ray range.
- 4 BM ports on large gap (90 mm) dipoles for very far-IR

=== Radiation sources ===
Continuing the tradition established by the NSLS, NSLS-II radiation sources span a very wide spectral range, from the far infrared (down to 0.1 eV) to the very hard X-ray region (>300 keV). This is achieved by a combination of bending magnets, three-pole wigglers, and insertion device (ID) sources.

== History ==
Construction of NSLS-II began in 2009 and was completed in 2014. NSLS-II saw first light in October 2014. The facility cost $912,000,000 to build, and the project received the DOE's Secretary's Award of Excellence. Torcon Inc., headquartered in New Jersey, was the general contractor selected by the DOE for the project. John Hill served as director of NSLS-II from 2015-2023 before becoming Deputy Director for Science and Technology at Brookhaven. Erik Johnson served as interim NSLS-II director for one year from August 2023. The current NSLS-II director, Elke Arenholz, assumed the position effective August 2024. The facility celebrated 10 years of operations in October 2024, with more than 15,000 beam time requests, 6,000 users, and 3,200 publications from the first nine years of operations.
