= George Kenneth Green =

American accelerator physicist

George Kenneth Green (1911 – August 15, 1977) was an American accelerator physicist.

Green studied at the University of California, Berkeley, where he belonged to the group of Ernest Lawrence. Later, he worked at Brookhaven National Laboratory (BNL) with Milton Stanley Livingston. After the discovery of Strong focusing by Ernest Courant et al., Green implemented the idea into the design of the Alternating Gradient Synchrotron, collaborating with John Blewett.

He was later working on the proposal for the National Synchrotron Light Source, which construction was begun in 1978.

Collaborating with Renate Chasman, he developed the Chasman-Green lattice, which was later used for storage rings of synchrotron light sources.
