= Brookhaven Graphite Research Reactor =

Research reactor at Brookhaven National Laboratory, US

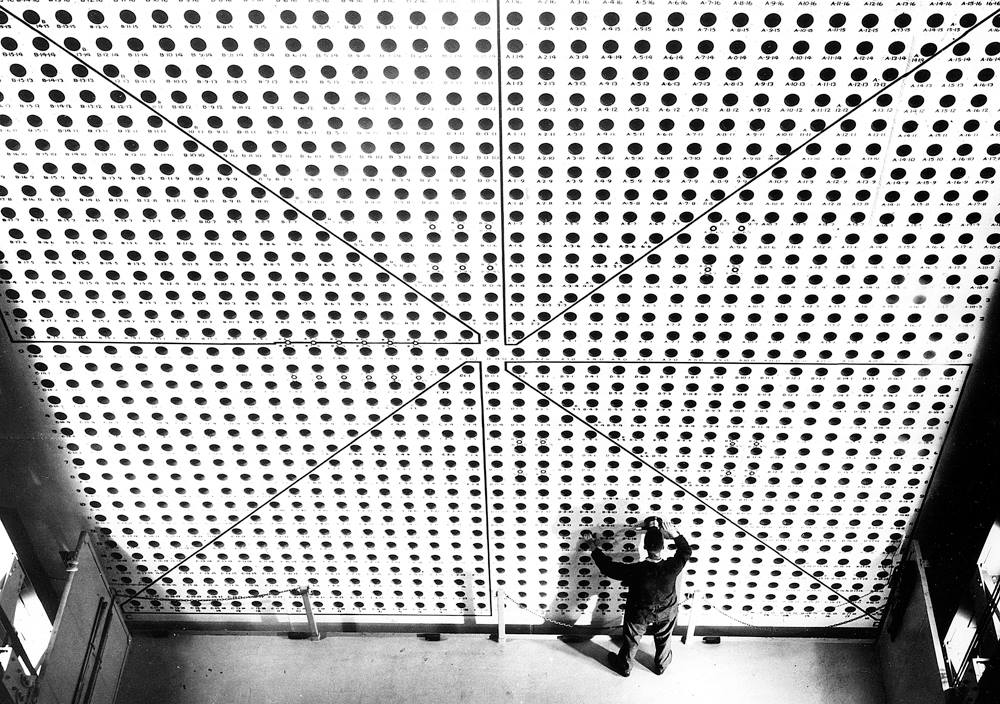
The face of the Brookhaven Graphite Research Reactor for loading the natural uranium fuel slugs, showing the same design as the X-10 Graphite Reactor

Brookhaven Graphite Research Reactor (BGRR) was a research reactor located at Brookhaven National Laboratory, a United States Department of Energy national laboratory located in Upton, New York, on Long Island, approximately 60 miles east of New York City. The BGRR operated from 1950 until 1968 and has been fully decommissioned.

== History ==
The BGRR was the first nuclear reactor built after World War II for exclusively peaceful use. It was the first reactor constructed at BNL. The primary purposes of the BGRR were to produce neutrons for scientific use and to refine nuclear reactor design. The reactor provided a source of neutrons for multidisciplinary scientific research in materials science, chemistry, biology, and physics.

Construction started on the reactor in 1947 and it became operational in August 1950.

== Design ==
The BGRR was an air cooled, graphite moderated, uranium fueled research reactor. The 700 ton reactor core consisted of a graphite cube 25 ft. on a side constructed from over 60,000 individual pieces of graphite. The reactor was cooled by air drawn through the core by three 1,000 hp. fans. The biological shield was constructed of high-density concrete containing steel spheres and the notably dense iron ore limonite. As a research reactor, BGRR never had a power conversion system to generate electricity; heat from the nuclear reactions was exhausted through a tall stack to the atmosphere.

The BGRR fuel elements were charged and discharged through graphite channel openings on the south pile face. Reactor operations were controlled by the position of 16 control rods that penetrated the reactor horizontally in directions parallel to the diagonals of the reactor base. The initial fuel of the BGRR was natural uranium (NU) which utilized aluminum fuel elements that were 11 feet long and contained 33 NU fuel slugs each. During the operation with the NU fuel, there were 28 fuel element failures.

In 1958, the NU fuel was replaced with highly enriched uranium (HEU) fuel clad with aluminum. Each HEU element was 24 inches long. The fuel elements each contained 15 grams of HEU at 93% uranium-235. The fissionable material was a uranium-aluminum alloy slab, covered on the top and bottom by aluminum sheets at least 20 mils thick with the edges welded all around.

The reactor was designed for 32 megawatts thermal, with a design-operating limit of 28 megawatts thermal for NU fuel. The reactor normally operated at approximately 20 megawatts with HEU.

The reactor facility design included both neutron beam lines for experiments external to the reactor core and also pipe loops which allowed experiments to be conducted as fluids flowed through the operating reactor core.

External to the reactor building, and shared with the subsequently constructed HFBR, was the Reactor Bypass Filter Facility (RBFF). This facility provided improved air cleaning prior to exhaust to the atmosphere in the unlikely event of a fuel element failure at either the BGRR or the HFBR. It also provided sufficient air cleaning to allow the use of air cooling as a method of combating a graphite fire at the BGRR. The facility was placed into operation in 1965.

== Decommissioning ==
After operating for 18 years, BGRR was functionally obsolete. The BGRR was placed in standby mode in June 1968, then permanently shut down in 1969. All fuel was removed from the reactor and shipped to the Savannah River Site by 1972. The BGRR was fully decommissioned in 2012 following a 13-year, $148 million process. Contaminated materials were shipped to Nevada and Utah for disposal.

Several buildings and structures which housed the BGRR and associated facilities remain in safe storage or repurposed for other uses as of 2020. Over its lifetime an estimated 25,000 individual experiments were performed by the reactor and accompanying scientists and engineers. The BGRR was the predecessor for the High Flux Beam Reactor also located at BNL.

The red and white, 320-foot-tall exhaust stack constructed for the BGRR in 1949 and later shared with the HFBR was a distinctive landmark for the area until its demolition in 2020.

== See also ==
- Brookhaven National Laboratory
- High Flux Beam Reactor (HFBR), successor to BGRR at Brookhaven National Laboratory, third and last reactor to be constructed at BNL
- Brookhaven Medical Research Reactor (BMRR), second reactor which operated at Brookhaven National Laboratory
- Chicago Pile-1 (CP-1), first artificial nuclear reactor, predecessor reactor to BGRR, uranium fueled graphite pile reactor similar in design and era located at the University of Chicago
- X-10 Graphite Reactor, predecessor reactor to BGRR, uranium fueled graphite pile reactor similar in design and era located at Oak Ridge National Laboratory
