= NASA Space Radiation Laboratory =

Ion accelerator at Brookhaven National Lab, for studying high-energy particle exposure

NASA Space Radiation Laboratory (NSRL)
- Established: 2003
- Research type: Nuclear physics, material physics and chemistry, environmental and biological research
- Budget: $34 million USD
- Location: Upton, New York
- Campus: 8 km^{2} (1977 acres)
- Operating agency: Brookhaven Science Associates, LLC
- Website: https://www.bnl.gov/nsrl/about.php

The NASA Space Radiation Laboratory (NSRL, previously called Booster Applications Facility), is a heavy ion beamline research facility; part of the Collider-Accelerator Department of Brookhaven National Laboratory, located in Upton, New York on Long Island. Its primary mission is to use ion beams (H^{+}to Bi^{83+}) to simulate the cosmic ray radiation fields that are more prominent beyond Earth's atmosphere.

== Overview ==
Jointly managed by the U.S. Department of Energy's Office of Science and NASA's Johnson Space Center, the facility employs beams of heavy ions that simulate the cosmic rays found in space. NSRL also features its own beam line dedicated to radiobiology research, as well as specimen-preparation areas. Although Brookhaven Lab researchers and their colleagues used heavy ion beams for radiobiology research at another Brookhaven accelerator from 1995, the NSRL became operational during summer 2003, and over 75 experimenters from some 20 institutions from the U.S. and abroad have taken part in radiobiology research in that year.

== Science ==
Since astronauts are spending more time in outer space, they are receiving more exposure to ionizing radiation, a stream of particles that, when passing through a body, has enough energy to cause the atoms and molecules within that substance to become an ion. By directly or indirectly ionizing and thus damaging the components of living cells, including genetic material called DNA, ionizing radiation may cause changes in cells' ability to carry out repair and reproduction. This may lead to mutations, which, in turn, may result in tumors, cancer, genetic defects in offspring, or death.

Although the spacecraft itself somewhat reduces radiation exposure, it does not completely shield astronauts from galactic cosmic rays, which are highly energetic heavy ions, or from solar energetic particles, which primarily are energetic protons. By one NASA estimate, for each year that astronauts spend in deep space, about one-third of their DNA will be hit directly by heavy ions.

In increasing knowledge of the effects of cosmic radiation, NSRL studies may expand the understanding of the link between ionizing radiation and aging or neuro-degeneration, as well as cancer. In aiming to limit the damage to healthy tissue by ionization, NSRL research may also lead to improvements in cancer radiation treatments.

NSRL researchers employ the unique Electron Beam Ion Source (EBIS) and the Alternating Gradient Synchrotron's Booster Accelerator to deliver heavy ion beams to a variety of biological specimens (tissues, cells, DNA in-solution), electronic equipment, and new materials to be used in space missions. This beam source allows the facility to change the ion that is being accelerated within 5 minutes and has led to a standardized beam delivery format among NSRL biology experimenters called the "GCR Simulator". This program combines a series of beams, from H^{+} to Fe^{26+}, of various energies, which mimics the absorbed dose to living issue over a period of time during beyond Earth orbit missions.

== See also ==
- Cosmic ray
- Health threat from cosmic rays
- Armed Forces Radiobiology Research Institute
- Synchrotron
- Particle therapy
