= Blue Oak (disambiguation) =

Blue Oak (Quercus douglasii) is a species of oak native to California.

Blue Oak may also refer to:

- Blue Oak School, a private elementary school in Napa, California
- Blue Oak Ranch Reserve, part of the University of California Natural Reserve System
- Blue Oak Energy, a photovoltaic energy company
- Blue Oak, a character from Pokémon
