= Elke Arenholz =

German American physicist

- Education: Free University of Berlin; University of Regensburg
- Known for: X-ray spectroscopy
- Scientific career
- Workplaces: CHESS; ALS

Elke Arenholz is a German American physicist working in the field of magnetic materials and X-ray spectroscopy, where she pioneered the use of superconducting vector magnets to study X-ray magnetic circular dichroism (XMCD). She is the director of the National Synchrotron Light Source II (NSLS-II) at Brookhaven National Laboratory.

== Education and career ==
Arenholz earned her Master of Science from the University of Regensburg. She then received her PhD from the Free University of Berlin, in Germany, where she started using X-rays to study magnetic materials.

In 1996, Arenholz joined the Advanced Light Source (ALS), in Berkeley, California as postdoctoral fellow, before joining the staff in 2000. Her first project there, an eight pole electromagnet providing magnetic fields up to 0.8 T in arbitrary directions relative to the incoming X-ray beam, was the first device installed at a synchrotron that could apply the magnetic field in any direction. In 2011, her team completed a first-of-its-kind superconducting vector magnet, similar to the eight pole magnet but providing up to 5 T in arbitrary directions.

From 2013 to 2019, she was also an adjunct associate professor in the department of materials science and engineering, at the University of California, Berkeley. In 2019, she joined CHESS in Ithaca, NY, as the associate director.

She had the role of director in the Physical Sciences Division of the Department of Energy, where her work covered fields such as chemical physics, materials science, catalysis, and geochemistry.

In June 2024, she was named Director of the National Synchrotron Light Source II at Brookhaven Lab.

In addition to the research she conducts at the ALS, Arenholz is a journal editor for AIP Advances, on the editorial board of the Journal of Magnetism and Magnetic Materials (JMMM), and was a program co-chair for the 2013 Joint MMM/Intermag Conference.

Arenholz has made over 400 publications in her career.

== Recognition ==
Arenholz became a fellow of the American Physical Society in 2014. She was named an IEEE Fellow, in the 2024 class of fellows, "for contributions to X-ray magnetic spectroscopy". In 2005 she was presented with the Klaus Halbach Award for Innovative Instrumentation for the design and implementation of a vector magnetometer for soft X-ray studies. In 2001 she was given the Tim Renner Award for her efforts in the assistance of users in generating high profile research with an elliptically polarizing undulator.
