= CFN =

CFN may refer to:

- Canadian Football Network
- Carlton Food Network, UK TV channel
- Center for Functional Nanomaterials
- CFN/CNBC or Class CNBC, a business and financial news TV channel in Italy
- College Football News
- Brazilian Marine Corps (Corpo de Fuzileiros Navais)
- Donegal Airport, Ireland, IATA code
- chemical formula of Cyanogen fluoride

Cfn

- Craftsman (Cfn) is the term for privates in some technical branches (e.g. the Royal Electrical and Mechanical Engineers)
