= ISABELLE =

Partially built particle accelerator in the US

Coordinates: 40°53′03″N 72°52′34″W

ISABELLE (also known later as Colliding Beam Accelerator, CBA) was a 200+200 GeV proton–proton colliding beam particle accelerator partially built by the United States government at Brookhaven National Laboratory in Upton, New York, before it was cancelled in July, 1983.

== Colliding beam accelerators ==
A colliding beam, storage ring accelerator was first proposed by Gerard O'Neill of Princeton in 1956, who built an electron-electron system beginning in 1957 (operational in 1962, first collisions in 1964) with assistance from Burton Richter, William C. Barber and Bernard Gittelman. The AdA accelerator, an electron-positron system, stored its first beam in 1961 at Frascati National Laboratories, Italy and was later moved to Orsay Laboratory, France, where in 1964 it recorded first e^{+}e^{−} collisions. At the same time, two colliding-beam experiments were conceived and built by Budker and his group at the Institute of Nuclear Physics in Novosibirsk, Russia, Soviet Union: electron-electron VEP-1 (first collisions in 1964) and electron-positron VEPP-2 (first collisions in 1965).

The idea of using alternating gradient synchrotron (AGS) technology to build storage rings for a proton-proton colliding beam accelerator was considered at a summer study held at Brookhaven in 1963. The Intersecting Storage Rings (ISR) facility at CERN, a 30+30 GeV proton-proton system, opened in 1971 and became the first high energy hadron collider. The SPEAR collider at the Stanford Linear Accelerator Center, a 3+3 GeV electron-positron system, was completed in 1972 and soon contributed to discoveries of the ψ meson and τ lepton, both recognized in Nobel Prizes. The ψ had previously been found in a fixed-target experiment at the Brookhaven AGS, where it was called the J, but it was better measured with SPEAR.

== The ISABELLE project ==
A design study for a proton storage ring system was completed at Brookhaven in 1973. In 1974 the U.S. High Energy Physics Advisory Panel recommended that ISABELLE (the Intersecting Storage Accelerator + "belle") should be built at Brookhaven. It was to be a 200+200 GeV proton-proton system using superconducting magnets. New York politicians, spurred by the sometimes impetuous Sen. Moynihan, pushed through funding before development of magnet technology had been completed. Construction began in 1978. The following year a prototype magnet was successfully tested. In 1981, however, production models of magnets failed at less than the magnetic field intensity needed for operation.

Delays in the project led to competitive evaluation against a proposal for a much larger machine, eventually called the Superconducting Supercollider, a proton-proton system aimed at 20,000+20,000 GeV; while developments in Europe at CERN, including discovery of the W and Z bosons, appeared to make ISABELLE redundant. In July, 1983, the U.S. Department of Energy cancelled the ISABELLE project after spending more than US$200 million on it. Cancellation of ISABELLE accelerated the United States fall from dominance in high energy physics and proved a harbinger for the much more costly cancellation of the Superconducting Supercollider in October, 1993. After years of planning and development, parts of the tunnel, experimental hall and magnet infrastructure built for ISABELLE were salvaged and reused by the Relativistic Heavy Ion Collider (RHIC), a US$617 million joint project of the U.S. Department of Energy and National Science Foundation which was approved in 1991 and began operation in 2000.

== See also ==
- List of accelerators in particle physics
- Fermi National Accelerator Laboratory, newest U.S. high energy facility, opened 1972, Tevatron closed 2011
- Super Proton Synchrotron, accelerator at CERN used to discover the W and Z bosons
- Large Electron–Positron Collider, accelerator also at CERN, operated from 1989 to 2000
- Large Hadron Collider, accelerator built in the CERN LEP tunnel, began operation in 2009
