= Brookhaven Medical Research Reactor =

Medical Research Reactor (MRR) was a research reactor which was located at Brookhaven National Laboratory, a United States Department of Energy national laboratory located in Upton, New York, on Long Island, approximately 60 miles east of New York City. The second of three reactors constructed at BNL, the MRR operated from 1959 until 2000 and has been partially decommissioned.

== History ==
The primary purpose of the MRR was to produce neutrons for medical research; MRR was the first reactor built specifically for medical research. As described in the lab’s 1964 annual report, “The Medical Research Reactor (MRR) was constructed for the sole purpose of exploring the possible applications of nuclear reactors to the study of man and his diseases. Each salient feature of the reactor was designed in relation to its use for therapy and diagnosis or in the advancement of basic medical science.” One of the treatments pioneered at this reactor was boron neutron capture therapy, or BNCT. This promising treatment was developed for use against glioblastoma multiforme, an otherwise untreatable and deadly form of brain cancer. The reactor first reach criticality on March 15, 1959 and continued operations until December 2000.

Experimental use included research concerned with the effects of ionizing radiation on tree seedlings, the application of neutron radiography to biological materials, thermal neutron irradiation of bacteria, and epithermal neutron irradiation studies utilizing the animal treatment facility for phantom and animal irradiations.

== Design ==
The MRR was housed in a cylindrical steel building 60 feet in diameter and 54 feet high. The reactor was connected to the larger Medical Research Center by two sets of airlocks. The reactor vessel was a cylindrical aluminum tank only 24 inches in diameter and 7 feet 7 inches tall. Cooling water was provided by connected piping. The reactor was fueled by enriched uranium and cooled and moderated by light water. A neutron reflector surrounded the reactor vessel to improve neutron economy. Control rods entered from the top of the core; a thick wall of high density concrete surrounded the reactor vessel and associated equipment to provide protection for workers and patients. Air which provided cooling for the neutron reflector and neighboring structures became slightly activated due to the high neutron flux field (argon-41) and was exhausted out a tall stack adjacent to the reactor building. As a research reactor, MRR never had a power conversion system to generate electricity; heat from the nuclear reactions was exhausted through the tall stack to the atmosphere and through heat exchangers to cooling water loops.

Operation on an intermittent basis was demanded by the nature of the research program. Operating power levels up to 3 MW were approved for continuous operation, and levels up to 5 MW were permitted for intermittent periods not to exceed 10 minutes. By 1964, increased use of the reactor for irradiation of biological samples prompted the lab to increase the reactor core loading to 20 BSF-type fuel elements in order to maintain sufficient excess reactivity so that fission product poisoning would not prevent consecutive daily start-ups of the MRR.

One of the reactor's four faces was equipped for the irradiation of large objects, while the holes that penetrated another face permitted irradiation of samples, activation analysis and production of short-lived radioisotopes. From the remaining two ports, streams of neutrons traveled to treatment rooms, for carefully controlled animal and human clinical studies. It produced a maximum neutron flux of about 20 trillion neutrons per square centimeter per second.

== Decommissioning ==
Due to a reduction of research funding, the MRR conducted its last run in December 2000; transition and stabilization activities began in 2001.

== See also ==
- Brookhaven National Laboratory
- Brookhaven Graphite Research Reactor (GBRR), the first reactor which operated at Brookhaven National Laboratory
- High Flux Beam Reactor (HFBR), the third and last reactor which operated at Brookhaven National Laboratory
