= High Flux Beam Reactor =

Former research reactor at Brookhaven National Laboratory, US

The High Flux Beam Reactor (HFBR) was a research reactor located at Brookhaven National Laboratory, a United States Department of Energy national laboratory located in Upton, New York, on Long Island, approximately 60 miles east of New York City. A successor to the Brookhaven Graphite Research Reactor, the HFBR operated from 1965 until 1996 and has been partially decommissioned.

== History ==
The primary purpose of the HFBR was to produce neutrons for multiple scientific uses. The reactor provided a source of neutrons for multidisciplinary scientific research in materials science, chemistry, biology, and physics. The reactor was used in the formulation of Nobel Prize-winning theories of cooperative ordering in large collections of atoms .

The reactor first reached criticality on October 31, 1965. About twice as large as the preceding BGRR, the HFBR initially operated at a thermal power level of 40 megawatts. Following an equipment upgrade in 1982, the reactor was operated at up to 60 megawatts thermal; a safety reanalysis resulted in the HFBR being shut down in 1989 and being limited to 30 megawatts thermal upon restart in 1991.

The HFBR shut down in December 1996 for routine maintenance and refueling. During shutdown, a leak of tritiated water was identified by routine sampling of groundwater from wells located adjacent to the reactor's spent fuel pool. Upon further investigation, a leak was discovered in the spent fuel pool that released tritium-contaminated water into the ground. The reactor remained shut for three years for safety and environmental reviews. In January 1998, all the spent fuel was removed and shipped off site to allow for the insertion of a stainless steel liner in the spent fuel pool for the restart of the reactor. However, in November 1999, the Department of Energy decided to permanently shut down the HFBR.

== Design ==
The HFBR was a heavy water cooled and moderated, enriched uranium fueled research reactor. The reactor core consisted of 28 individual fuel assemblies arranged in a close-packed array. The fuel material was enriched uranium alloyed in aluminum and clad with aluminum in curved plates. Heavy water (D_{2}O) served as the moderator/neutron reflector and primary coolant. The reactor vessel was fabricated from an aluminum alloy and contained the active core, reflector, and control rods. The vessel consists of an 82-inch diameter spherical section welded to a 46-inch diameter cylinder. The overall height of the vessel assembly was 24.75 feet. There were nine horizontal beam entry tubes that are integral parts of the vessel's spherical section. The core region provided space and access for 16 experimental facilities.

The reactor was housed within a confinement structure topped by a semi-hemispherical dome. The reactor sat inside a confinement building constructed of welded steel plates supported by an I-beam framework that rests on a cylindrical base. The inside diameter of the hemisphere at its base is 176 feet 8 inches. The cylindrical base is 22 feet 4 inches high and rests on a bed plate that is bolted to the reinforced concrete foundation ring. The foundation of the confinement building is a 5 ft. thick reinforced concrete mat bearing on the soil beneath the building. The interior of the confinement building contained the reactor and biological shield and was divided into equipment, experimental, balcony, and operations levels. The operations level contained the control room, instrument and maintenance shops, labs and offices. The equipment level contained the spent fuel pool water purification system, pumps and heat exchangers, cooling systems, and the spent fuel pool. The experimental level was for scientific users. The reactor biological shield, which surrounded the reactor, occupied the central portion of this level. A large open space surrounding the biological shield housed experimental equipment and there were labs and offices along the perimeter wall. Offices, locker rooms, toilets, and HVAC equipment were located on the balcony. The confinement building has four access points: a personnel airlock; a forklift airlock; and two tractor-trailer airlocks, one located on the experimental level and one on the equipment level.

Nine neutron beam lines extended from the HFBR in a radial spoke pattern. Up to 15 experiments could be run concurrently on the nine beam lines. Two reactor operators and two supervisors crewed the HFBR control room around the clock. In addition to the beam lines, seven sample irradiation thimbles for neutron activation experiments were provided which extended from the spherical reactor vessel towards the nuclear fuel.

As a research reactor, HFBR never had a power conversion system to generate electricity. Heat from the nuclear reactions was transferred from the circulating heavy water moderator and coolant to a secondary cooling loop of ordinary water which flowed through cooling towers located west of the HFBR confinement.

Notably, the reactor produced its greatest neutron flux outside of the core, rather than within, which allowed for greatest options in the design of experiments.

During 1993, the HFBR underwent safety upgrades as well as installation of new scientific instruments.

External to the reactor building, and shared with the previously constructed BGRR, was the Reactor Bypass Filter Facility (RBFF). This facility provided improved air cleaning prior to exhaust to the atmosphere in the unlikely event of a fuel element failure at either the BGRR or the HFBR. It also provided sufficient air cleaning to allow the use of air cooling as a method of combating a graphite fire at the BGRR. The facility was placed into operation in 1965.

== 1994 TRISTAN Experiment Fire ==
On March 31, 1994, a small fire broke out in one of the beam line experiments being conducted on the experimental floor outside of the reactor and biological shield. The reactor, associated reactor operations systems, and safety systems were not involved in the fire.

The experiment studying the decay of lanthanum-148, named TRISTAN, which burned contained a cylindrical capsule of 5 grams of uranium approximately 1 inch in diameter and 1 ½ inches tall. The capsule had been exposed to neutrons from a reactor beam line. Solid and gaseous fission products, including gaseous iodine-131, had been produced during the experiment and were released in the fire. Smoke from the fire was identified by on-duty personnel approximately 2:20 a.m.; the reactor was shut down at 2:45 a.m. and the HFBR confinement evacuated at 3:47 a.m. At 4:51 a.m. BNL officials declared an Alert emergency, the second lowest of four emergency classifications. The fire self-extinguished after the electrical power supply to the experiment was turned off.

Seven laboratory personnel were minimally contaminated by radionuclides entrained in the smoke from the fire. All seven were decontaminated at showers at the lab and released to return home.

At the time of the fire, a minute amount of radiation was released to the atmosphere from the vent stack serving BGRR and HFBR. The amount of radiation released was compared to a few seconds to typical background radiation. BNL officials and New York state health officials agreed that there was no danger posed to the public from the release.

HFBR was shut down for multiple investigations until June 1994, then restarted. The TRISTAN experiment was permanently discontinued.

== Decommissioning ==
The decontamination and decommissioning of the HFBR complex, consisting of multiple structures and systems to operate and maintain the reactor, was completed from 1999 until 2009. The control rod blades were removed and shipped offsite in 2009. The emptied and cleaned HFBR dome, which still contains the irradiated reactor vessel is maintained under surveillance. Final decommissioning of the HFBR confinement is to be performed at the end of a radionuclide decay period not exceeding 65 years.

The red and white, 320-foot-tall exhaust stack constructed for the BGRR in 1949 and later shared with the HFBR was a distinctive landmark for the area until its demolition in 2020.

== See also ==
- Brookhaven National Laboratory
- Brookhaven Graphite Research Reactor, predecessor to HFBR at Brookhaven National Laboratory
- Brookhaven Medical Research Reactor (BMRR), another reactor which operated at Brookhaven National Laboratory
