= Long Island Solar Farm =

Photovoltaic array in eastern United States

- Country: United States
- Coordinates: 40°52′N 72°51′W
- Status: Operational
- Construction began: 2010
- Commission date: November 2011
- Owners: BP Solar & MetLife

Solar farm
- Type: Flat-panel PV
- Site area: 200 acres (80.9 ha)

Power generation
- Units operational: 164,312
- Nameplate capacity: 37 MW_{p}
- Annual net output: 44 GWh (5 MW avg)

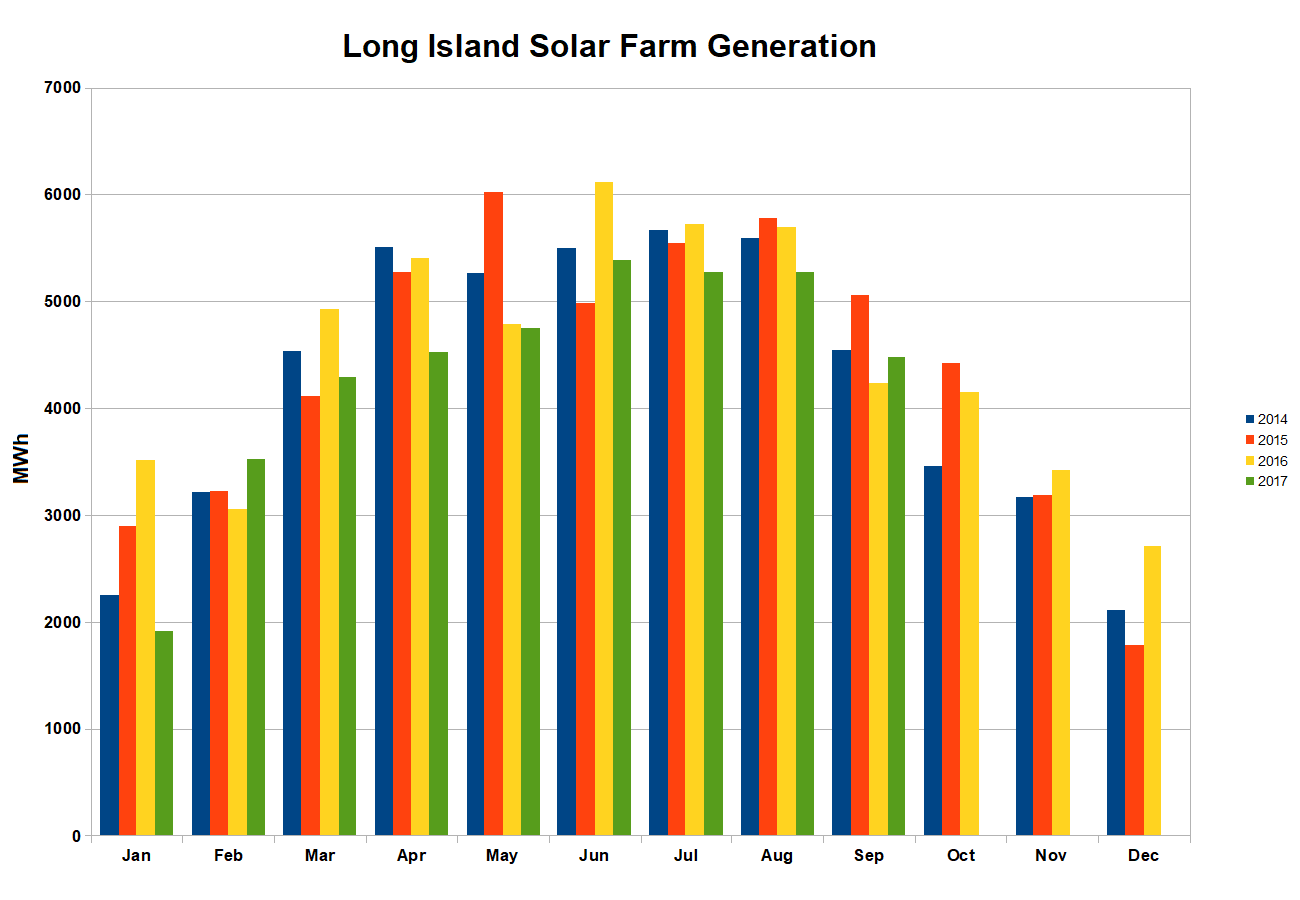
Long Island Solar Farm monthly generation

The 32 megawatt AC Long Island Solar Farm (LISF), located in Upton, New York, was the largest photovoltaic array in the eastern U.S. in November 2011. The LISF is made up of 164,312 solar panels from BP Solar which provide enough electricity for roughly 4,500 households. The project will cause the abatement of more than 30,000 metric tons of carbon dioxide emissions per year. LISF is co-owned by BP Solar and MetLife through Long Island Solar Farm LLC. Municipal utility Long Island Power Authority (LIPA) buys the 37-megawatt (49,600 hp) power plant's output, which is estimated at 44 GWh annually, under a 20-year power purchase agreement (PPA). Payments over that time are expected to total $298 million (34¢/kWh, 60¢/LIPA customer/month). The project was engineered by Blue Oak Energy and construction subcontracted to Hawkeye LLC from Hauppauge, New York. The plant earned the Best Photovoltaic Project of Year Award from the New York Solar Energy Industries Association. The panels are mounted at a fixed tilt angle of 35°, with the rows spaced approximately 18 ft 4 in (5.59 m) apart.

The solar farm uses 25 of the 1.25 MVA inverters and a 34.5 kV collector system. Since the connection to the grid is at 69 kV, and acquiring a spare step-up transformer of that capacity has a long lead time, a spare transformer is maintained onsite. Each inverter has an associated meteorological station to help researchers correlate plant output with observed and predicted weather, to help learn how to integrate photovoltaics into the power grid.

A formal case study of the development of the Long Island Solar Farm was published by the U.S. Department of Energy in May 2013.

== Eastern Long Island Solar Project ==
The 17 MW (AC) Eastern Long Island Solar Project or Suffolk Solar Carport Project consists of a group of projects, three at LIRR carparks. $124 million has been allocated to pay for the electricity generated, over 20 years, from the project (approximately 27¢/kWh). Plans to install solar panels at Ronkonkoma LIRR have stalled.

Project Locations
Location	Town	Output (MW AC)	Modules	Number of arrays
H. Lee Dennison Building	Hauppauge	1.75	7,737	24
North County Complex	Hauppauge	0.5	3,431	9
Cohalan Court Complex	Central Islip	3.5	15,113	27
Riverhead County Center	Riverside	3	11,536	31
Brentwood LIRR Parking Lot	Brentwood	1	3,924	11
Deer Park LIRR Parking Lot	Deer Park	2.25	3,924	39
Ronkonkoma LIRR Parking Lot (south)	Ronkonkoma	5	20,110	44

== Clean Solar Initiative ==
LIPA has a Clean Solar Initiative which will install an additional 50 MW of solar photovoltaics, to be paid $0.22/kWh over a 20-year period. 5 MW is reserved for small systems of from 50 kW to 150 kW, 10 MW for systems from 150 kW to 500 kW, and the remaining 35 MW is for systems of any size, up to 20 MW. All systems must be connected to the grid at the 13.2 kV level. Systems connected before July 2012 are not eligible.

== See also ==
- New York energy law
