= Renate Chasman =

Renate Chasman

Renate Wiener Chasman (January 10, 1932 – October 17, 1977) was a physicist.

She was born Renate Wiener to German Jewish parents in Berlin. Her father, Hans Wiener, was a founder of the Social Democratic Party of Germany. In 1938, the Wiener family fled Nazi Germany through the Netherlands to Sweden, where Wiener grew up and attended school in Stockholm.

Wiener and her sister Edith went to Israel to attend Hebrew University of Jerusalem. Wiener graduated in 1955 with a M.Sc. in physics with minors in chemistry and mathematics. She earned her PhD in experimental physics in 1959. Her doctoral thesis demonstrated that a pseudoscalar component was not involved in parity nonconservation in beta decay.

Chien-Shiung Wu was doing similar work and invited Wiener to work at Columbia University as a research associate. There she met Wu's graduate student Chellis Chasman and together they investigated beta decay. They married in 1962.

In 1962, the Chasmans went to Yale University to work with David Allan Bromley in nuclear spectroscopy. Chasman joined Brookhaven National Laboratory in 1963. Beginning in the department of physics at Brookhaven, she transferred in 1965 to the accelerator department.

In the following years, she facilitated important contributions to the development of particle accelerators, redesigning the alternating-gradient proton synchrotron (AGS). Together with George Kenneth Green, she is known for the invention of the Chasman-Green lattice for synchrotron storage rings.

She died in 1977 from melanoma. The Brookhaven National Lab has a scholarship named after Chasman.
