= Magnetic lattice (accelerator) =

In accelerator physics, a magnetic lattice is a composition of electromagnets at given longitudinal positions around the vacuum tube of a particle accelerator, and thus along the path of the enclosed charged particle beam. The lattice properties have a large influence on the properties of the particle beam, which is shaped by magnetic fields. Lattices can be closed (cyclic accelerators like the synchrotrons), linear (for linac facilities) and are also used at interconnects between different accelerator structures (transfer beamlines).

Such a structure is needed for focusing of the particle beam in modern, large-scale facilities. Its basic elements are dipole magnets for deflection, quadrupole magnets for strong focusing, sextupole magnets for correction of chromatic aberration, and sometimes even higher order magnets. Many lattices are composed of identical substructures or cells, which denote a special magnet arrangement that may reoccur at several positions along the path.

While almost all accelerator lattices that are in use in modern facilities are specifically designed for their particular purpose, the lattice development starts at a given ideal lattice design with high periodicity and mostly using only one base cell. The most widely known are

- FODO lattice, which is the simplest possible strong focusing lattice
- Chasman–Green lattice

A Magnet Accelerator is very important for fast moving of objects.
