= Chasman–Green lattice =

Arrangement of magnets

The Chasman–Green lattice, also known as a double bend achromat lattice (DBA lattice), is a special periodic arrangement of magnets designed by Renate Chasman and George Kenneth Green of Brookhaven National Laboratory in the mid-1970s for synchrotrons. This lattice provides optimized bending and focusing of electrons in storage rings designed for synchrotron light sources. An electron storage ring constructed with a Chasman–Green lattice has the important property that the circulating electron beams have very low emittance, which results in the emission of synchrotron light of exceptional brightness. For this reason it is the lattice of choice for most of the premier synchrotron light source facilities worldwide.

Each period of the Chasman–Green lattice contains a focusing quadrupole magnet symmetrically located between a pair of identical dipole magnets, which transports incident electrons through a bending arc to an exit path that is independent of the electron energy.
