= Blue Oak Energy =

American photovoltaic energy company

- Type: Private
- Industry: Renewable energy, Photovoltaic, Solar energy
- Founded: 2003
- Founder: Tobin Booth
- Fate: Acquired by TRC Companies (2022)
- Headquarters: Sacramento, California, U.S.
- Key people: Danny Lee, SVP; Ryan Zahner, VP
- Website: www.blueoakenergy.com

Blue Oak Energy is an American full-service photovoltaic system design, engineering and consulting firm. The company engineers commercial and utility solar photovoltaic (PV) energy systems in the United States and abroad.

The company engineered and constructed the Google campus in Mountain View, California, the San Francisco International Airport, and the 37MW Long Island Solar Farm, and has designed solar installations for Whole Foods, Staples, Walmart, the US Navy, and the State of California.

The company was acquired in 2022 by TRC Companies, Inc.

== History ==
In 2003, Tobin Booth established Blue Oak Energy in Davis, California.

In 2006, the firm was selected to engineer the campus-wide distributed generation solar facility at the Google headquarters in Mountain View, California.

In 2008, Blue Oak Energy began delivering commercial rooftop solar projects for REI retail stores and warehouse facilities throughout the United States.

In late 2011, the firm partnered with Baker Electric Solar to complete the design and construction oversight for a 1.5MW project for the U.S. Marine Corps Air Ground Combat Center in Twentynine Palms, California. Blue Oak Energy designed hardware for the solar panel mounting involved in the project.

In December 2012, Blue Oak Energy constructed Arizona's largest rooftop solar array (4.2MW) at a First Solar facility.

By 2013, the firm engineered and constructed a 4.4MW utility scale solar farm located in Shasta County, California.

In 2014, Blue Oak Energy engineered and constructed the 2.6MW Putah Creek Solar Farm near Davis, California. That same year, the firm engineered and constructed the 908KW Fortinet distributed generation solar campus project in Santa Clara, California.

In 2022, Blue Oak Energy was acquired by TRC Companies, Inc., a consulting and engineering renewables company, for an undisclosed amount.

== Recognition ==
During 2013, Blue Oak Energy was placed #629 in Inc. Magazine's annual listing of the 5,000 fastest growing private companies in the United States.

In 2014, Solar Power World Magazine listed Blue Oak Energy as the #98 solar contractor in the United States.
