= Center for Functional Nanomaterials =

US research laboratory

The Center for Functional Nanomaterials (CFN) is a science laboratory specializing in nanoscale research. It is located at the Brookhaven National Laboratory on Long Island, New York, United States.

== Overview ==
The CFN provides capabilities for the fabrication and study of nanoscale materials, with an emphasis on atomic-level tailoring to achieve desired properties and functions. The CFN is a science-based user facility, simultaneously developing scientific programs while offering access to its capabilities and collaboration through an active user program.

The CFN is operated for and funded by the US Department of Energy's Office of Science.

== Scientific themes ==
The science at the CFN is organized around these scientific themes:

- Electronic Nanomaterials;
- Interface Science and Catalysis;
- Electron Microscopy;
- Soft and Biological Materials;
- Theory and Computation.

Scientific highlights within these themes can be found at the CFN Research Highlights Archive.

== Research facilities ==
The CFN is housed in a building consisting of offices and laboratories, located next to the National Synchrotron Light Source (NSLS). The facility contains five groups of laboratories called Laboratory Facilities, a Theory and Computational Center, and a set of advanced endstations on beamlines at the NSLS.

The Laboratory Facilities include capabilities in nanopatterning, transmission electron microscopy, nanomaterials synthesis, ultrafast laser sources, and powerful probes to image atomic and molecular structure, together with clean rooms and other support instrumentation. Access is also offered to the Laser Electron Accelerator Facility (LEAF).

== User program ==
The CFN is operated as a national user facility, accessible to researchers at universities, and industrial and national laboratories through peer-reviewed proposals. The user program provides access to laboratory facilities staffed by scientists and technical support personnel who are active in nanoscience research.

=== Modes of Access ===
General Users are researchers or research group that use the CFN's facilities for non-proprietary research, after the submission of a proposal and its positive evaluation by an external Proposal Review Panel (PRP).

Partner Users are General users who also enhance the facility capabilities or contribute to the Center operation. They typically help develop instrumentation in some manner, either by bringing external financial or intellectual capital into the development of the facility. These contributions must be made available to the General Users and, therefore, benefit the overall User Program as well as the facility. Partner Users are provided negotiated access to one or more capabilities over a period of several years.

Rapid Access: Users who feel that the timeliness of their research may be negatively affected by the length of the whole proposal-review process can request Rapid Access. Proposals submitted for rapid access are reviewed and approved by the CFN Director, technically assisted, if necessary, by pertinent group or facility leaders. Besides being feasible at the CFN and scientifically important, proposals being considered for Rapid Access must include a justification of the time-sensitive nature of the project.

== Proposal submission and review process ==
Prior to submitting a proposal, prospective users are encouraged to identify the appropriate CFN scientists and capabilities needed for their research project, and contact the CFN staff to confirm feasibility. Although not required, early discussion with CFN scientist(s) can help the prospective user understand the capabilities available, feasibility, safety & training issues, and level of effort required. There are three work cycles per year: January–April, May–August, and September–December.

All user proposals undergo a feasibility/safety review by CFN staff. The prospective user is advised of any concerns/issues and offered the opportunity to revise the proposal, if appropriate, to resolve those issues/concerns. After the initial review, the proposals are sent to an external Proposal Review Panels (PRP). Each proposal is assigned to the most relevant panel, reviewed and scored by at least three panel members. Rapid access proposals are reviewed by the CFN Director. The PRP scores and comments are used by the Facility Leaders or designees to prioritize access to CFN. Prospective users are notified of the decision (accept/decline) and given the feedback comments from the PRP.

Once the proposal has been accepted, a User Agreement is executed (if none is in place). The prospective user schedules the facility time with the Facility Leader or designee, and conducts work. The user is expected to publish the results in the peer-reviewed literature. At the conclusion of the project, the user completes an End-of-Experiment Survey and reports related publications/presentations to the CFN. If the user needs to continue his project after the proposal expires in two years, he/she is required to submit a final project report before the new proposal is accepted.

CFN users may conduct either non-proprietary (pre-competitive research to be published) or proprietary research. Prospective users must designate if any/all of their user proposal involves proprietary information and if any of the user project, if accepted, would be proprietary work. For proprietary work at the CFN, full-cost recovery is required and a proprietary research agreement (.pdf) must be in place prior to starting work. BNL makes efforts to secure appropriate intellectual property control so that proprietary-research users can exploit their experimental results.

Upon acceptance of a user proposal for non-proprietary research, the user's institution is required to execute a nonproprietary user agreement. In addition to defining the terms & conditions for intellectual property created during the user project, the agreement confirms that the user will publish the results in the open technical literature in return for no-fee access to the CFN.
