= Brookhaven National Laboratory =

American laboratory in Upton, New York

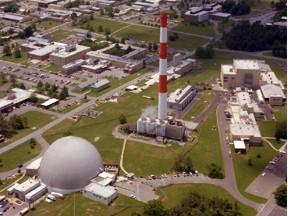
- View of Brookhaven National Laboratory campus, with the High Flux Beam Reactor in the foreground
- Motto: "Passion for discovery"
- Established: 1947
- Research type: Nuclear and high-energy physics, materials science, nanomaterials, chemistry, energy, and environmental, biological, and climate sciences
- Budget: Over US$550 million (2015)
- Director: John Hill
- Staff: 2,750
- Location: Upton, Suffolk County, New York, United States; 40.875°N 72.877°W
- Campus: 21 km^{2} (5,265 acres)
- Affiliations: United States Department of Energy
- Operating agency: Brookhaven Science Associates, LLC
- Website: bnl.gov

Map
- Location within New York

Brookhaven National Laboratory (BNL) is a United States Department of Energy national laboratory located in Upton, New York, a hamlet of the Town of Brookhaven. It was formally established in 1947 at the site of Camp Upton, a former U.S. Army base on Long Island. Located approximately 60 miles east of New York City, it is managed by Stony Brook University and Battelle Memorial Institute.

Research at BNL includes nuclear and high energy physics, energy science and technology, environmental and bioscience, nanoscience, and national security. The 5,300-acre campus contains several large research facilities, including the Relativistic Heavy Ion Collider and National Synchrotron Light Source II. Seven Nobel Prizes have been awarded for work conducted at Brookhaven Lab.

== Overview ==
BNL operations are overseen by a Department of Energy Site office, is staffed by approximately 2,750 scientists, engineers, technicians, and support personnel, and hosts 4,000 guest investigators every year. The laboratory is guarded by a Department of Energy Protective Force, has a full service fire department, and has its own ZIP code (11973). In total, the lab spans a 5,265-acre (21 km^{2}) area that is mostly coterminous with the hamlet of Upton, New York. BNL is served by a rail spur operated as-needed by the New York and Atlantic Railway. Co-located with the laboratory is the New York, NY, weather forecast office of the National Weather Service.

=== Major programs ===
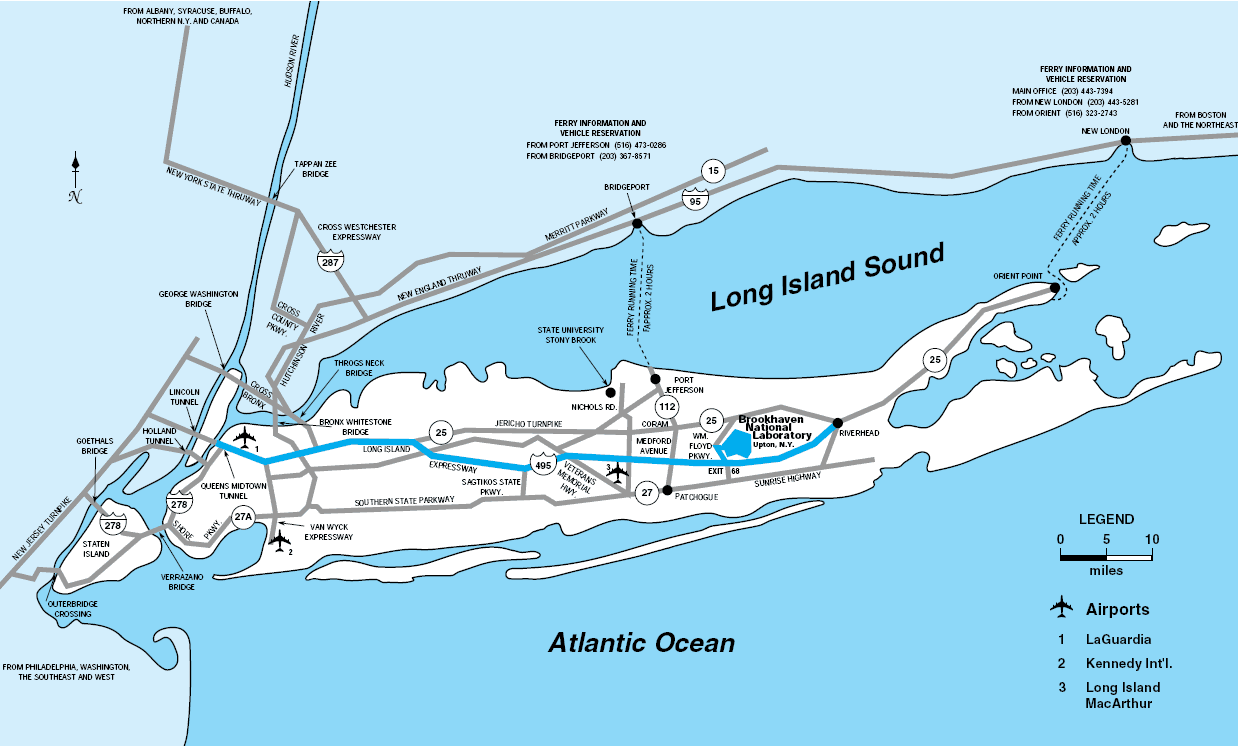
Location of Brookhaven National Laboratory relative to New York City

Although originally conceived as a nuclear research facility, Brookhaven Lab's mission has greatly expanded. Its foci are now:

- Nuclear and high-energy physics
- Physics and chemistry of materials
- Environmental and climate research
- Nanomaterials
- Energy research
- Nonproliferation
- Structural biology
- Accelerator physics

=== Operation ===
Brookhaven National Lab was originally owned by the Atomic Energy Commission and is now owned by that agency's successor, the United States Department of Energy (DOE). DOE subcontracts the research and operation to universities and research organizations. It is currently operated by Brookhaven Science Associates LLC, which is an equal partnership of Stony Brook University and Battelle Memorial Institute. From 1947 to 1998, it was operated by Associated Universities, Inc. (AUI), but AUI lost its contract in the wake of two incidents: a 1994 fire at the facility's high-flux beam reactor that exposed several workers to radiation and reports in 1997 of a tritium leak into the groundwater of the Long Island Central Pine Barrens on which the facility sits.

== History ==
=== Foundations ===
Following World War II, the US Atomic Energy Commission was created to support government-sponsored peacetime research on atomic energy. The effort to build a nuclear reactor in the American northeast was fostered largely by physicists Isidor Isaac Rabi and Norman Foster Ramsey Jr., who during the war witnessed many of their colleagues at Columbia University leave for new remote research sites following the departure of the Manhattan Project from its campus. Their effort to house this reactor near New York City was rivalled by a similar effort at the Massachusetts Institute of Technology to have a facility near Boston. Involvement was quickly solicited from representatives of northeastern universities to the south and west of New York City such that this city would be at their geographic center. In March 1946 a nonprofit corporation was established that consisted of representatives from nine major research universities — Columbia, Cornell, Harvard, Johns Hopkins, MIT, Princeton, University of Pennsylvania, University of Rochester, and Yale University.

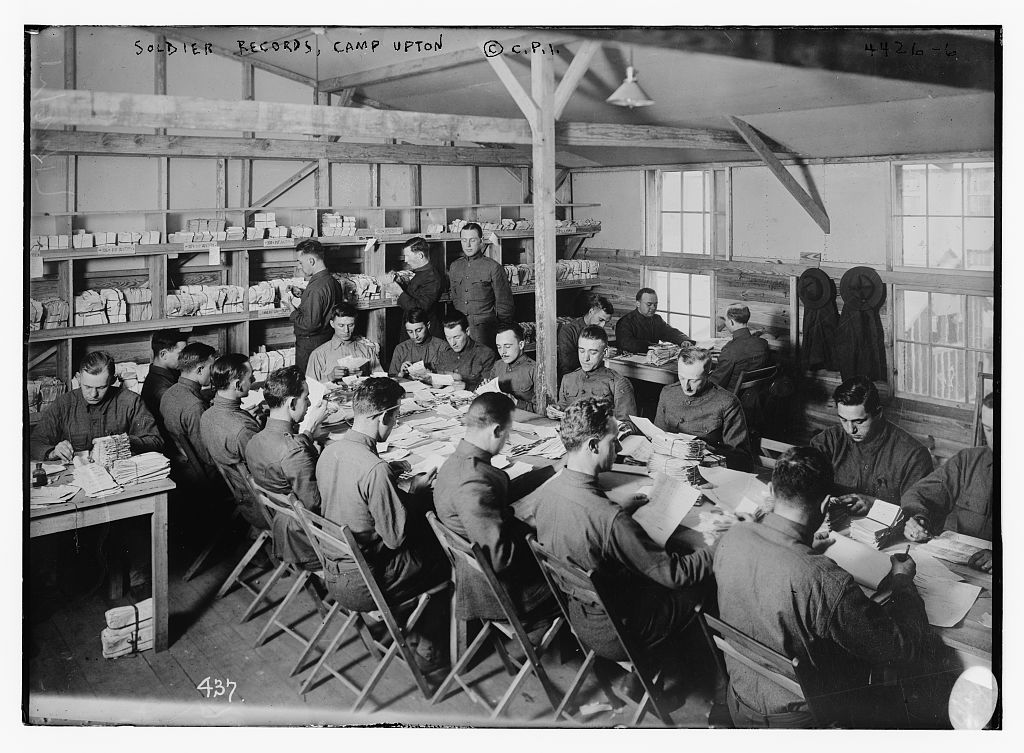
Soldiers during World War I at the Camp Upton site, which would in 1947 be repurposed as BNL

Out of 17 considered sites in the Boston-Washington corridor, Camp Upton on Long Island was eventually chosen as the most suitable in consideration of space, transportation, and availability. The camp had been a training center for the US Army during both World War I and World War II, and a Japanese internment camp during the latter. Following the war, Camp Upton was no longer needed, and a plan was conceived to convert the military camp into a research facility.

On March 21, 1947, the Camp Upton site was officially transferred from the U.S. War Department to the new U.S. Atomic Energy Commission (AEC), predecessor to the U.S. Department of Energy (DOE).

=== Research and facilities ===
==== Reactor history ====
In 1947 construction began on the first nuclear reactor at Brookhaven, the Brookhaven Graphite Research Reactor. This reactor, which opened in 1950, was the first reactor to be constructed in the United States after World War II. The High Flux Beam Reactor operated from 1965 to 1999. In 1959 Brookhaven built the first US reactor specifically tailored to medical research, the Brookhaven Medical Research Reactor, which operated until 2000.

==== Accelerator history ====
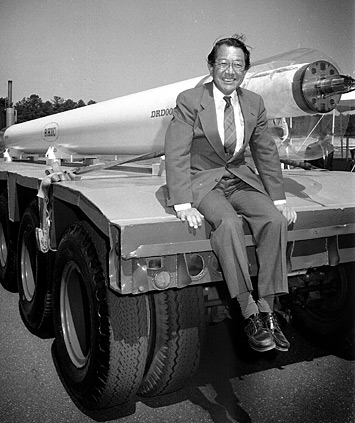
Satoshi Ozaki posed with a magnet for the Relativistic Heavy Ion Collider in 1991

In 1952 Brookhaven began using its first particle accelerator, the Cosmotron. At the time the Cosmotron was the world's highest energy accelerator, being the first to impart more than 1 GeV of energy to a particle. The Cosmotron was retired in 1966, after it was superseded in 1960 by the new Alternating Gradient Synchrotron (AGS). The AGS was used in research that resulted in three Nobel Prizes, including the discovery of the muon neutrino, the charm quark, and CP violation.

In 1970 in BNL started the ISABELLE project to develop and build two proton intersecting storage rings. The groundbreaking for the project was in October 1978. In 1981, with the tunnel for the accelerator already excavated, problems with the superconducting magnets needed for the ISABELLE accelerator brought the project to a halt, and the project was eventually cancelled in 1983.

The National Synchrotron Light Source operated from 1982 to 2014 and was involved with two Nobel Prize-winning discoveries. It has since been replaced by the National Synchrotron Light Source II.

After ISABELLE'S cancellation, physicist at BNL proposed that the excavated tunnel and parts of the magnet assembly be used in another accelerator. In 1984 the first proposal for the accelerator now known as the Relativistic Heavy Ion Collider (RHIC) was put forward. The construction got funded in 1991 and RHIC has been operational since 2000. One of the world's only two operating heavy-ion colliders, RHIC is as of 2010 the second-highest-energy collider after the Large Hadron Collider. RHIC is housed in a tunnel 2.4 miles (3.9 km) long and is visible from space.

On January 9, 2020, It was announced by Paul Dabbar, undersecretary of the US Department of Energy Office of Science, that the BNL eRHIC design has been selected over the conceptual design put forward by Thomas Jefferson National Accelerator Facility as the future Electron–ion collider (EIC) in the United States. In addition to the site selection, it was announced that the BNL EIC had acquired CD-0 (mission need) from the Department of Energy. BNL's eRHIC design proposes upgrading the existing Relativistic Heavy Ion Collider, which collides beams light to heavy ions including polarized protons, with a polarized electron facility, to be housed in the same tunnel.

==== Other discoveries ====
In 1957, Brookhaven scientists conducted the Goldhaber experiment, the first experiment to measure the helicity of the neutrino.

In 1958, Brookhaven scientists created one of the world's first video games, Tennis for Two.

In 1967, Brookhaven scientists patented Maglev, a transportation technology that utilizes magnetic levitation.

In 2024, Brookhaven National Laboratories scientists discovered a new kind of antimatter nucleus.

== Major facilities ==
- Relativistic Heavy Ion Collider (RHIC), which was designed to research quark–gluon plasma and the sources of proton spin. Until 2009 it was the world's most powerful heavy ion collider. It is the only collider of spin-polarized protons.
- Center for Functional Nanomaterials (CFN), used for the study of nanoscale materials.
- National Synchrotron Light Source II (NSLS-II), Brookhaven's newest user facility, opened in 2015 to replace the National Synchrotron Light Source (NSLS), which had operated for 30 years. NSLS was involved in the work that won the 2003 and 2009 Nobel Prize in Chemistry.
- Alternating Gradient Synchrotron, a particle accelerator that was used in three of the lab's Nobel prizes.
- Accelerator Test Facility, generates, accelerates and monitors particle beams.
- Tandem Van de Graaff, once the world's largest electrostatic accelerator.
- Computational Science resources, including access to a massively parallel Blue Gene series supercomputer that is among the fastest in the world for scientific research, run jointly by Brookhaven National Laboratory and Stony Brook University.
- Interdisciplinary Science Building, with unique laboratories for studying high-temperature superconductors and other materials important for addressing energy challenges.
- NASA Space Radiation Laboratory, where scientists use beams of ions to simulate cosmic rays and assess the risks of space radiation to human space travelers and equipment.

== Off-site contributions ==
It is a contributing partner to ATLAS experiment, one of the four detectors located at the Large Hadron Collider (LHC), via the Omega Group. It is currently operating at CERN near Geneva, Switzerland.

Brookhaven was also responsible for the design of the SNS accumulator ring in partnership with Spallation Neutron Source in Oak Ridge, Tennessee.

Brookhaven plays a role in a range of neutrino research projects around the world, including the Daya Bay Reactor Neutrino Experiment in China and the Deep Underground Neutrino Experiment at Fermi National Accelerator Laboratory.

Brookhaven continues to support the precision experiment Muon g-2 at Fermilab, after being the host of the experiment from 1989 to 2001.

== Public access ==
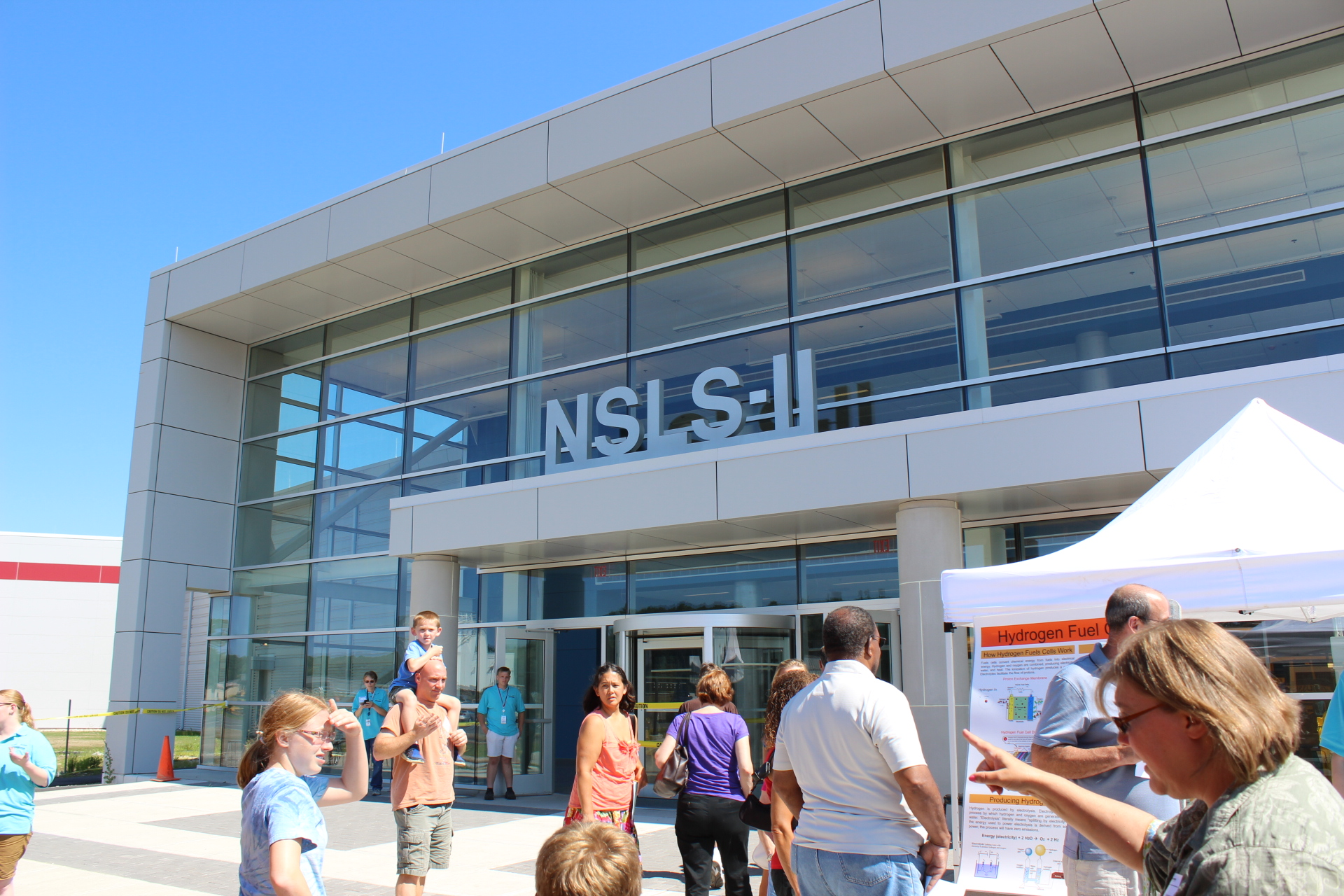
Exterior of National Synchrotron Light Source II facility in 2012, during a Brookhaven National Laboratory "Summer Sundays" public tour.

For other than approved Public Events, the Laboratory is closed to the general public. The lab is open to the public on several Sundays during the summer for tours and special programs. The public access program is referred to as 'Summer Sundays' and takes place in July, and features a science show and a tour of the lab's major facilities. The laboratory also hosts science fairs, science bowls, and robotics competitions for local schools, and lectures, concerts, and scientific talks for the local community. The Lab estimates that each year it enhances the science education of roughly 35,000 K-12 students on Long Island, more than 200 undergraduates, and 550 teachers from across the United States.

== Environmental cleanup ==
In January 1997, ground water samples taken by BNL staff revealed concentrations of tritium that were twice the allowable federal drinking water standards—some samples taken later were 32 times the standard. The tritium was found to be leaking from the laboratory's High Flux Beam Reactor's spent-fuel pool into the aquifer that provides drinking water for nearby Suffolk County residents.

DOE's and BNL's investigation of this incident concluded that the tritium had been leaking for as long as 12 years without DOE's or BNL's knowledge. Installing wells that could have detected the leak was first discussed by BNL engineers in 1993, but the wells were not completed until 1996. The resulting controversy about both BNL's handling of the tritium leak and perceived lapses in DOE's oversight led to the termination of AUI as the BNL contractor in May 1997.

The responsibility for failing to discover Brookhaven's tritium leak has been acknowledged by laboratory managers, and DOE admits it failed to properly oversee the laboratory's operations. Brookhaven officials repeatedly treated the need for installing monitoring wells that would have detected the tritium leak as a low priority despite public concern and the laboratory's agreement to follow local environmental regulations. DOE's on-site oversight office, the Brookhaven Group, was directly responsible for Brookhaven's performance, but it failed to hold the laboratory accountable for meeting all of its regulatory commitments, especially its agreement to install monitoring wells. Senior DOE leadership also shared responsibility because they failed to put in place an effective system that encourages all parts of DOE to work together to ensure that contractors meet their responsibilities on environmental, safety and health issues. Unclear responsibilities for environment, safety and health matters has been a recurring problem for DOE management.

Since 1993, DOE has spent more than US$580 million on remediating soil and groundwater contamination at the lab site and completed several high-profile projects. These include the decommissioning and decontamination of the Brookhaven Graphite Research Reactor, removal of mercury-contaminated sediment from the Peconic River, and installation and operation of 16 on- and off-site groundwater treatment systems that have cleaned more than 25 billion gallons of groundwater since 1996.

Shortly after winning the contract to operate the lab in 1997, BSA formed a Community Advisory Council (CAC) to advise the laboratory director on cleanup projects and other items of interest to the community. The CAC represents a diverse range of interests and values of individuals and groups who are interested in or affected by the actions of the Laboratory. It consists of representatives from 26 local business, civic, education, environment, employee, government, and health organizations. The CAC sets its own agenda, brings forth issues important to the community, and works to provide consensus recommendations to Laboratory management.

== Nobel Prizes ==
=== Nobel Prize in Physics ===
- 1957 – Chen Ning Yang and Tsung-Dao Lee – parity laws
- 1976 – Samuel C. C. Ting – J/Psi particle
- 1980 – James Cronin and Val Logsdon Fitch – CP-violation
- 1988 – Leon M. Lederman, Melvin Schwartz, Jack Steinberger – Muon neutrino
- 2002 – Raymond Davis, Jr. – Solar neutrino

=== Nobel Prize in Chemistry ===
- 2003 – Roderick MacKinnon – Ion channel
- 2009 – Venkatraman Ramakrishnan and Thomas A. Steitz – Ribosome

== List of laboratory directors ==
The following persons served as lab directors since 1946:

No.	Image	Name	Term start	Term end	Notes
1		Philip Morse	1946	1948	
2		Leland Haworth	1948	1961	
3		Maurice Goldhaber	1961	1973	
4		George Vineyard	1973	1981	
5		Nicholas Samios	1982	1997	
Interim		Lyle Schwartz	1997	1997	
Interim		Peter Bond	1997	1997	
6		John Marburger	1997	October 23, 2001	
Interim		Peter Paul	October 26, 2001	March 31, 2003	
7		Praveen Chaudhari	April 1, 2003	April 30, 2006	
Interim		Samuel Aronson	May 1, 2006	August 18, 2006	
8		Samuel Aronson	August 18, 2006	December 31, 2012	
Interim		Doon Gibbs	January 1, 2013	March 29, 2013	
9		Doon Gibbs	March 29, 2013	April 17, 2023	
Interim		Jack Anderson	April 18, 2023	June 2023	
10		JoAnne Hewett	June 2023	September 23, 2025	
Interim		John Hill	September 23, 2025	Present	

== See also ==
- Center for the Advancement of Science in Space—operates the US National Laboratory on the ISS.
- Goldhaber fellows
