= Upton, New York =

- Hamlet and census-designated place
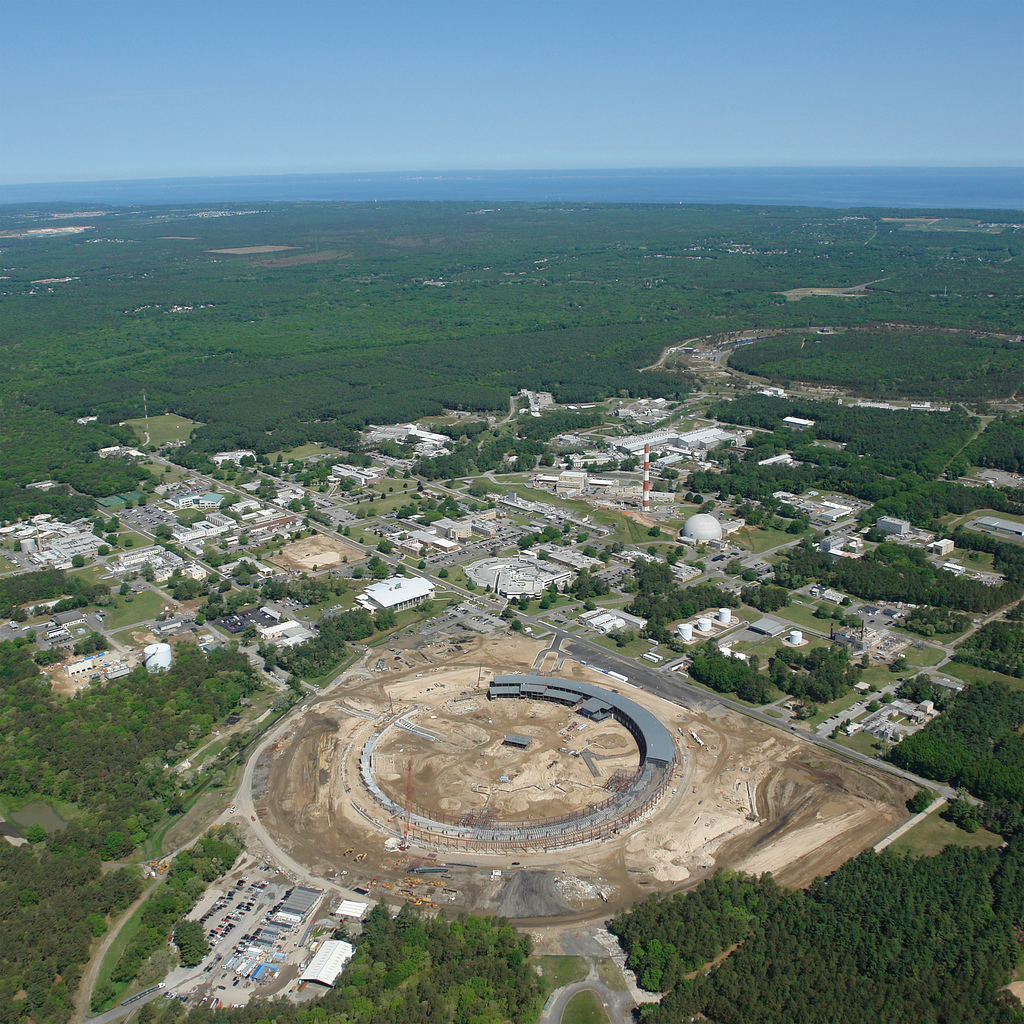
- Brookhaven National Laboratory in Upton, as seen from the air.

- Location within the state of New York
- Coordinates: 40°52′10″N 72°53′12″W
- Country: United States
- State: New York
- County: Suffolk
- Elevation: 89 ft (27 m)
- Time zone: UTC−5 (Eastern (EST))
  - Summer (DST): UTC−4 (EDT)
- ZIP Code: 11973
- Area code: 631
- FIPS code: 36-83426
- GNIS feature ID: 0971807

Upton is a hamlet and census-designated place (CDP) located on Eastern Long Island in the town of Brookhaven in Suffolk County, New York, United States. It is the home of the Brookhaven National Laboratory and a National Weather Service weather forecast office serving the New York metropolitan area.

The hamlet is so named because it was the site of the U.S. Army's Camp Upton, which was active from 1917 until 1920, and again from 1940 until 1946. During World War II, the camp was rebuilt primarily as an induction center for draftees. The Army was later to use the site as a convalescent and rehabilitation hospital for returning wounded.

The 32 megawatt (MW) Long Island Solar Farm (LISF), located in Upton, is the largest photovoltaic array in the eastern United States. The LISF is made up of 164,312 solar panels which provide enough electricity for roughly 4,500 households. The project will cause the abatement of more than 30,000 metric tons of carbon dioxide emissions per year. It earned the Best Photovoltaic Project of Year Award from the New York Solar Energy Industries Association.
